This is a list of Member of the Order of the British Empire (MBE) awards in the 1918 Birthday Honours.

The 1918 Birthday Honours were appointments by King George V to various orders and honours to reward and highlight good works by citizens of the British Empire. The appointments were made to celebrate the official birthday of The King, and were published in The London Gazette in early June 1918.

The recipients of honours are displayed here as they were styled before their new honour, and arranged by honour, with classes (Knight, Knight Grand Cross, etc.) and then divisions (Military, Civil, etc.) as appropriate.

Member of the Order of the British Empire (MBE) awards

Major Charles Reginald Abbott — Staff Officer, 2nd Class, Royal Air Force
John Dixon Abbott — Partner, Motor Rail and Tram Car Co., Ltd.
Captain Ivor Yorath Acraman  —  Canal Superintendent, Manchester
John Stockton Adamson  — Commandant of Voluntary Aid Detachments, West Lancashire
Fred Adcock — Technical Assistant, Directorate of Fortifications and Works, War Office
Commissioned Armourer Ernest Addy 
Major Eustace Montagu Lafone Ainslie  — Controller of a Reception Park, Aeroplane Supply Depot, Royal Air Force
Agnes Mary Aitchison  —  Financial Branch, Coal Mines Department, Board of Trade
Andrew Aitken  Member of Ayrshire Local Tribunal
Violet May Alcock — Higher Grade Clerk, War Trade Department
Sarah Julia Warde-Aldam — Commandant, Hooton Pagnell Auxiliary Hospital, Doncaster
George Alder — Ermin's Floating Dock Company, Middlesbrough
Henry George Randall Aldridge — Organiser and Officer in charge, Sidney House and Eastfield Auxiliary Hospitals, Hampshire
William Frederick Aldridge— Supervising Clerk, War Office
Samuel Grant Alexander  Honorary Secretary, Inverness-shire Branch, Scottish Branch, British Red Cross Society
Captain James Craig Allan — Appeal National Service Representative, Lanarkshire
Major Michael Henry Percival Allen — Staff Officer, 2nd Class, Royal Air Force
Ephraim Allinson — Superintendent and Chief Clerk, East Riding Police
Thomas Allison —Station Superintendent, Glasgow, Caledonian Railway
Horace Benjamin Allum — Staff Clerk, Supplies Division, HM Office of Works. 
Philip Fermor Ambrose — Superintendent, Kent County Police 
Captain Fulcher Amey  — Officer in charge of Equipment Branch, Inspection Department, Woolwich, Ministry of Munitions
Lillian Eva Amy — Welfare  Supervisor, Messrs. C. A. Vandervell & Co.
Charles Anderson — Honorary Secretary, West Hartlepool War Savings Committee
Charles James Anderson — Section Director, Finance Department, Ministry of Munitions
Daisy Kate Anderson — In charge of Typists Section, Contracts Directorate, War Office
George Anderson — Actuary of the Preston Trustee Savings Bank; Honorary Secretary to the Trustee Savings Banks Association
Lieutenant Percy Anderson — Mechanical Warfare (Overseas and Allies) Department, Ministry of Munitions
Major Cyril Rogers Andrews — Staff Officer, 2nd Class, Royal Air Force
Major George Henry Andrews — For services with the British Expeditionary Force, Salonika
Horace George Andrews — Accountant-General's Department, Admiralty
Lieutenant Geoffrey Edmund Appleby — For an act of gallantry not in the presence of the enemy
Thomas William Archer — Acting Torpedo Store Officer, Torpedo Store Department, Admiralty
Second Lieutenant Thomas Armitstead — For an act of gallantry not in the presence of the enemy
Robert Bayles Armstrong — Assistant Manager, Engineering Side, Messrs. Hawthorn, Leslie & Co.
Second Lieutenant Thomas Edward Steele Armstrong — For services with the British Expeditionary Force, Mesopotamia
Henry George Arnold —  Victualling Store Officer, Royal Victoria Yard, Deptford
Mary Adelaide Ashford — Welfare  Superintendent at one of the establishments of Messrs. Kynoch, Limited
George Kerfoot Ashton — Chief Special Constable, Manchester Special Constabulary
2nd Lieutenant William Thomas Finley Atherton —  Anti-Aircraft Defences, Home Forces
Dorothea Atkinson — Commandant, Walden Place Auxiliary Hospital, Essex
Lucy Mary Montagu Atkinson — Quarter Master, Devizes Auxiliary Hospital
William Edward Audland  Assistant County Director, Northamptonshire, British Red Cross and Order of St. John of Jerusalem
Captain Arthur Lintott Aylmer — Honorary Treasurer, Camps Library
Henry John Ayres — Clerk, War Office
Edith Frances Backhouse — In charge of Typing Section, Adastral House (War Office)
Cyril Bailey — Sub-Section Director, Labour Department, Ministry of Munitions
Sidney Alfred Bailey —  Minor Staff Clerk and Establishment Officer, National Health Insurance Commission (England)
Major William Edward Bailey — Officer Clerk, War Office
Elizabeth Margaret Baillie
John William Owen Baines — Director of Flour and Bread Section, Ministry of Food
Constance Kennedy Baird — Officer in charge, Transport of Relatives of Wounded Department, Le Touquet, France
Atheling Herbert Baker — Inspector (Honorary), Department of Surveyor-General of Supply, War Office
Lieutenant Frank Clement Ball — Anti-Aircraft Defences, Home Forces
Louisa Orme Bamford — Quarter Master, Ashbourne Auxiliary Hospital, Derbyshire
James Bancroft — Works Manager, Messrs. Howard and Bullough, Limited
David Armitage Bannerman — Assistant Secretary to Red Cross Commissioner, France
Lieutenant Louis Walter Barber — For an act of gallantry not in the presence of the enemy
Evelyn Barker — Honorary Secretary, Clothing and Comforts Depot, Dublin, British Red Cross and Order of St. John of Jerusalem
Harold Hastings Barker —  Special Assistant Chemist, Inspection Department, Woolwich, Ministry of Munitions
Lucy Marjorie Kathleen Pratt-Barlow —  Unit Administrator, Queen Mary's Army Auxiliary Corps
Captain Geoffrey Arthur Barnett — Deputy Assistant Adjutant-General, Egyptian Expeditionary Force
Samuel Henry Gilmore Barnett — Works Manager at a National Shell Factory
Stephen Allen Barns — Senior Temporary Assistant Technical Examiner of Works, War Office
Hilda Madeleine Baron — Commandant, Alford Auxiliary Hospital, North Lincolnshire
Ernest Wilfred Edwards Barton —  Voluntary Driver, Motor Ambulance Convoy, British Red Cross, Italy
John William Abell Bassett  Mayor of Burton-on-Trent; Chairman of the National Service Committee
Edward Batch — Assistant Controller of Timber Supplies (Overseas Purchases Branch), Board of Trade
Mary Bate — Superintendent at a Munition Workers' Canteen
Charles William Bates — Secretary for the Salonika Area, YMCA
Janet Mary Batger —  Acting Chief Lady Supervisor — Directorate of Mobilisation, War Office
Beatrix Marguerite Batten — Commandant, Abbey Lodge Hospital, Chislehurst
Warrant Shipwright John Thomas Batten 
Winifred Eleanor
Sarah Batten — Voluntary Aid Detachment Commandant, Staples, British Red Cross Commission, France
Lieutenant George Henry Batty  —  Confidential Clerk to the Director of Military Operations, War Office
Edward Swayn Bayliss — Acting Contract Officer, Contract Department, Admiralty
Gilbert Thomas Bayliss — General Manager, Small Arm Ammunition Department, Messrs. Rudge-Whitworth, Limited
Charlotte Augusta Baynes — Superintendent, Catholic Women's League Huts, France
Warwick Henry Beanes — Technical Assistant, Messrs. Perkins Engineers, Limited
Richard Frith Beard — Chief Aliens Officer, Swansea
John Millar Beattie — Manager at a National Shell Factory
Captain Arthur Edward Beecroft  —  Signal Services, Home Forces
Donald Glassford Begg — Honorary Secretary, River Plate Contingent Committee, British Red Cross Society
Charles David Jarrett Bell — Acting Constructor, Admiralty
Kathleen Audrey Danvers Bainbridge-Bell — Assistant in Parliamentary Branch, Ministry of Food
2nd Lieutenant Lee Bell — For an act of gallantry not in the presence of the enemy
Florence Sarah Benjamin — Superintendent, Bandages Department, Central Workrooms, British Red Cross Society
William Roger Bennett — Clerk, War Office
Bessie Benson — For Munition Canteen Work in Ireland
Charles Frederick Delaval Beresford —  British Vice-Consul, Cherbourg
Mary Ann Berry — Assistant Controller of Inspection, Queen Mary's Army Auxiliary Corps
William Edmund Bethell — Manager, The Cotton Powder Co., Ltd.
Nora Magdalen Bickley —  Treasury Solicitor's Department, Law Courts Branch
Eleanor, Lady Biddulph — Head of Records Department, Central Prisoners of War Committee
Christina Turnbull Bilton — Matron, 28 General Hospital, Salonika Expeditionary Force
Annie Janet Binnie —  Record Clerk, France, British Red Cross Commission
Aubrey Brian Binns — Chief of Technical Department, Messrs. Swan, Hunter & Wigham Richardson
Captain Wyndham Lindsay Birch  —  West Yorkshire Regiment, attached Royal Air Force
Lieutenant Douglas Joseph Bird — For an act of gallantry not in the presence of the enemy
Hugh Birrell — Temporary Secretary to His Britannic Majesty's Minister, Christiania
Philip Birtwistle — Technical Assistant, Machine Tool Department, Ministry of Munitions
Richard Winsor Bishop — Company Commander, Norwich Special Constabulary
Major Gordon Boyes Black — Canadian Forestry Corps
Captain Mortimer Charles Blackett — Staff Captain of a Training Brigade, Australian Imperial Force
Ida Louisa Blackman — Quarter Master, Normanhurst Auxiliary Hospital, Battle, Sussex
Harry Cooper Blackwell — Chief Inspector, Birmingham City Police
Hilda Blackwell — Private Secretary to Con-joint Secretary, Ministry of National Service
Atholl Blair —  Boiler Shop and Foundry Manager, Messrs. Harland & Wolff
Robert Blair —  Messrs. McKie & Baxter, Glasgow
Mary Blamires —  Huddersfield and District Women's Committee for Soldiers and Sailors
Robert Blaylock — Works Manager, Messrs. Darlington Forge Company, Darlington
Gertrude Alice Bliss — Honorary Secretary, Streatham Division, British Red Cross Society
Captain Frank Robert Bloor — For services with the British Expeditionary Force, Salonika
Mary Blount —  Dublin Local War Pensions Committee
The Hon. Ethel Jane Blyth — Commandant, Grange Auxiliary Hospital, Surrey
Daniel Roberts Bolt —  Voluntary Worker for Belgian Refugees, Poplar and Stepney
Lieutenant-Colonel Edwin Bolton — Member of the Stirling Local Tribunal
James Ryding Bond — Secretary and Executive Officer, Derbyshire War Agricultural Executive Committee
Mary Baxter Bonhote — Assistant to Legal Adviser and Secretary of Orders Committee, Ministry of Food
William Frederic Bonser — Chairman  of the Central Sub-Advisory Committee (Recruiting), City of London
Harold Robert Yerburgh-Bonsey — Divisional Commander, Metropolitan Special Constabulary
Madge Boosey — Commandant, Oakley Auxiliary Hospital, Bromley, Kent
Maud Booth — Honorary Secretary, Lancaster War Pensions Local Committee
Robert Gordon Borland  —  Civil Engineering Assistant — Directorate of Fortifications and Works, War Office
Lieutenant Thomas Albert Edward James Bosanquet 
Emma Boulnois — Organising Superintendent of a Canteen for Government Clerks, YMCA
Thomas William Bourn  —  National Service Representative, Newcastle
Elizabeth Bowles — Commandant, Lydney Auxiliary Hospital, Gloucestershire
Alfred Thomas Bowman  —  Clerk, War Office
Charles Bowyer  —  Coal Mines Department, Board of Trade
Anne Jamieson Boyd  —  Hospitality Fund for Travelling Soldiers and Sailors, Edinburgh
Florence Adelia Brackenbury — Chairman, Lincoln (Lindsey) Women's War Agricultural Committee
Captain Stanley Goodwin Bradshaw  —  Appeal National Service Representative
Edwin Lewton-Brain — Acting First Assistant Electrical Engineer, Department of Director of Dockyards and Repairs, Admiralty
Lieutenant Hugh Gerner Brain  —  Deputy Assistant Adjutant-General, Administrative Headquarters, Australian Imperial Force
Ethel Primrose Brake — Ministry of National Service
Percy Bramwell  — Deputy Assistant Inspector of Seaplanes, Aeronautical Inspection, Ministry of Munitions
Gertrude Ethel Brander — Higher Grade Woman Clerk, Ministry of Shipping
Captain David Bremner — Master of a Transport
Vincent Talbot Brennan —  Accountant-General's Department, Admiralty
Lieutenant Thomas Stamp Brewis — Senior Port Officer, Expeditionary Force Canteens
Mary Helen Thorpe Brice — Higher Grade Clerk, Acton Employment Exchange, Ministry of Labour
Charles Brickenden — Chief Cartographer, Naval Intelligence Division, Admiralty
Stanley Alexander Bridger —  Foreman of the Yard, Gibraltar
Owen Brien — Superintendent, Royal Irish Constabulary
Elsie Baron Briggs — Deputy Assistant Inspector of Fuzes, Ministry of Munitions
Gwendoline Mary Brill — Lady Supervisor, War Office
Arthur William Brodie — First Class Assistant Accountant, Finance Department, War Office
Rhoda Brodie — Honorary Secretary, Croydon Borough Association of Honorary Workers
Alice Brooks — In charge of General Service Department, County Director's Office, County of London, Order of St. John of Jerusalem
Captain Louis Egerton Broome — Deputy Assistant Director of Inland Water Transport, Egyptian Expeditionary Force
Frederick Harry Broomfield — Principal Electrical Cable Overseer, Department of the Director of Electrical Engineering, Admiralty
Albert Thomas Brown —  Timber Supplies Department, Board of Trade
Lieutenant Cecil Norman Brown —  Anti-Aircraft Defences, Home Forces
Cicely Leadley-Brown —  Welfare Supervisor at a National Projectile Factory
Cuthbert Brown —  District Surveyor, Edmonton
David Brown — Chief Draughtsman, Shipyard, Messrs. Vickers, Ltd., Barrow
Lieutenant Everard Kenneth Brown —  Northern Command, Home Forces
Lieutenant Geoffrey William Brown —  Administrative Officer and Assistant Adjutant at a School of Instruction
Lieutenant George Thomas Brown — Canadian Army Medical Corps
Harry Percy Brown — Assistant Staff Engineer, General Post Office
Margaret Bennett Brown — Commandant-in-Charge, Murrell Hill Auxiliary Hospital, Carlisle
Mary Louisa Hester Clerke-Brown — Commandant, Swyncombe House Auxiliary Hospital, Watlington, Henley-on-Thames
Reginald Brown — President, Southall and District Horticultural Society
Charles Brudenell-Bruce — Temporary Secretary to His Britannic Majesty's Minister, Christiania
Elizabeth Bruce — Head of the Clerical Staff, War Trade Intelligence Department
Emma Jane Bryning — Chief Superintendent of Typists, War Office
Rhoda Agnes Buchanan —  Brentford Local War Pensions Committee
Frank Steele Buck — Assistant, Establishment Branch, Explosives Supply Department, Ministry of Munitions
Margaret Buck — Housekeeper in Charge of Nurses Home, New Zealand Convalescent Hospital, Hornchurch
Ethel Agnes Buckle — Donor and Manager of two Coffee Stalls with the British Expeditionary Force, France
Mildred Emily Bulkley —  Woman Welfare Officer, Birmingham, Ministry of Munitions
Gertrude Bullen — Voluntary Aid Detachment, New Zealand General Hospital, Brockenhurst
Ralph, Bullock — Divisional Commander, Metropolitan Special Constabulary
William Henry Bunch — Works Manager at a National Shell Factory
Michael Bunney — Assistant Director, Chemical Section, Trench Warfare Supply Department, Ministry of Munitions
Senior Mate Walter Patrick Burden 
Walter Chapman Burder  Commandant, Voluntary Aid Detachment 24, and Chairman of Loughborough General Hospital, Leicestershire
Cecil Charles Burleigh — Assistant Director of Feeding, Stuffs, Ministry of Food
Louisa Joan Burne — Organiser of Hostels for Workers at 3rd London General Hospital, and of Central Joint Voluntary Aid Detachment Hostel
William Hodgson Burnet —  Architectural Assistant, 1st Class, HM Office of Works
Lieutenant David Alexander Burrage — For an act of gallantry not in the presence of the enemy
John Harold Burridge  Commandant and Medical Officer in Charge, Slough Auxiliary Hospital
Frank Playfair Burt — Senior Lecturer in Chemistry at Manchester University; Chief Assistant to Deputy Inspector of High Explosives, Manchester, Ministry of Munitions
George Henry Butcher —  Tractor Representative for Herefordshire Food Production Department
Sidney Herbert Butcher— Master of Bermondsey Workhouse. 
Harold Butler — Partner, Messrs. J. Butler & Co.
Francis Pratt Caird — Inspecting Engineer, Machine Tool Department, Ministry of Munitions
Major Bruce McGregor Caldwell — Officer in Charge of Canadian Postal Corps
David Caldwell —  Outside Foreman Engineer, Messrs. John G. Kincaid and Co., Ltd., Greenock
Rupert Harry Calvert —  Non-Ferrous Materials Supply Department, Ministry of Munitions
William Scott Cameron  Secretary to the Inspection Committee of Trustee Savings Banks
Annie Campbell Campbell
Lieutenant Frederick Harold Campbell — For an act of gallantry not in the presence of the enemy
Henry Kenyon Campbell — Secretary, East Cumberland Munitions Board of Management
William Robert Campbell  —  Ministry of National Service
Edith Frances Carbonell — Head of Addressograph Department, Central Prisoners of War Committee, County of London
Major John Carr — Recruiting Area Commander, Bristol City, Ministry of National Service
Charles Maurice Carter — Acting Constructor, Department of Director of Naval Construction, Admiralty
George Carter —  Naval Store Department, HM Dockyard, Chatham
Daisy Olive Cartmail — Honorary Secretary to Matron-in-Chief — Headquarters, British Red Cross Society and Order of St. John of Jerusalem
Mary Glendinning Carver — Naval Intelligence Division, Admiralty
Clare Catley — Section Director, Factory Accounts, Ministry of Munitions
Ida Jessie Causton — Organiser and Commandant, Pinner Auxiliary Hospital, Middlesex
Samuel Edward Cavan — Chief Clerk to Chief Inspector of Quarter Master-General's Services, War Office
Charles John Cawood  Food Production Sub-Commissioner for Yorkshire
Dora Cayley — General Overlooker, Small Arms Ammunition, Park Royal, Ministry of Munitions
Frank Chaplin — Member of the City of London Advisory Committee
Florence Chapman — Quarter Master, Buxton Auxiliary Hospital
George Russell Chapman — Secretary, Hut Week Department, YMCA
Edward Hazlehurst Cherry — Assistant Secretary, Navy and Army Canteen Board
James Childs — Head Iron Foreman, Messrs. Swan, Hunter and Wigham Richardson
Martha Chippendale —  Major, Salvation Army; Secretary of the Naval and Military League
Helen Gertrude Chune — Quarter Master, Highland Moors Auxiliary Hospital, Llandrindod Wells
George Charles Churchward —  Commission Internationale de Ravitaillement
Arthur George Chuter —  Commission Internationale de Ravitaillement
Adel Dorothy Claremont —  Founder and Honorary Organiser of the Stick Crutch Fund
Captain D'Arcy Melville Clark — For services with the British Expeditionary Force in France
Lieutenant John Mactaggart Clark — For an act of gallantry not in the presence of the enemy
Lieutenant William Morrison Clark — For an act of gallantry not in the presence of the enemy
Francis William Clarke — Temporary Second Class Clerk, Colonial Office. Harold Claughton, War Office
Alfred Clegg  Headmaster of the East Crompton Church of England School, Lancashire; Chairman of the Crompton Urban District Council
Bella Clegg — Commandant, Bodlondeb Auxiliary Hospital, Menai Bridge, Anglesey
Ethel Theodora Clegg — Area Controller, Queen Mary's Army Auxiliary Corps
Fred Clements —  Station Master, St. Pancras Station, Midland Railway
William Clough —  Late Organising Officer, Bury Munitions' Board of Management
Captain Alfred Henry Clucas — For an act of gallantry not in the presence of the enemy
Millie Gertrude Clutterbuck —  Registry, Air Ministry
Dora Alexandrina Cochran — Joint Women's Voluntary Aid Detachment Department, Devonshire House
John Alexander Cockburn — Manager of the Manufacturing Division at one of the Factories of Nobel's Explosives Company
Captain Charles George Coe —  Equipment Officer, Royal Air Force
Charles Henry Cole — Civil Engineer, Admiralty
Arthur Charles Coleman — Senior Assistant Inspector of Munitions, Pittsburg District, U.S.A., Ministry of Munitions
Second Lieutenant Colin Goss Coleridge — Royal Air Force
Captain Thomas Bellasyse Colley —  Acting Commandant of Physical and Bayonet Training, Canadian Forces
Willoughby Collier — Clerk, War Office
Lieutenant-Commander Abraham Bennett Collins  Pier Master, Hawes Pier, South Queensferry
George Alfred Collins —  Local Manager of Avonmouth Docks
John Howarth Collins — Deputy Assistant Inspector of Engines, Aeronautical Inspection, Ministry of Munitions
Frederick Collis —  Personal Assistant to Council Member "S," Ministry of Munitions
Captain Joseph Leonard Colman — Deputy Assistant Adjutant-General, Australian Imperial Force Depots
The Hon. George Charles Colville — Secretary to the Sub-Advisory Committee (Recruiting) of the Institute of Chartered Accountants
Captain Harvey Alexander Brabazon Combe — For services with the British Expeditionary Force in France
Captain William Connett — Master of a Transport
Rudolph Consterdine —  District Secretary of an Army Area in France, YMCA
Agnes Ethel Conway — Honorary Secretary of Women's Committee of the Imperial War Museum
William John Cooke —  Yard Master, Norwood Junction, London Brighton and South Coast Railway
Edward Alfred Coombs — Honorary Treasurer, Kensington War Savings Committee
Allan Ernest Cooper — Managing Director, Messrs. Allan Cooper & Co.
Eleanor Valentine Cooper — Quarter Master, "The Cecils" Auxiliary Hospital, Worthing
Harry Gordon Cooper  Assistant County Director for Altrincham Division of Cheshire, British Red Cross and Order of St. John of Jerusalem
Geoffrey Silverwood Cope —  Transport Officer and Secretary, King George Hospital, London
John Reginald Corah — Assistant County Director, Leicestershire, British Red Cross and Order of St. John of Jerusalem
The Hon. Katharine Corbet — Honorary Lady Superintendent and Organiser, Shropshire Area, YMCA
Kate Agnes Corner — Superintendent of a National Filling Factory Settlement
Donald Welldon Corrie — Secretary to London Office of the Imperial Munitions Board
Mabel Emily Hartridge Cory — Commandant, Fordham Auxiliary Hospital, Cambridgeshire
Amy Joan Cottell — Member of the British War Mission to the United States of America
Thomas Sturge Cotterell  Superintendent, one of HM Magazines, Ministry of Munitions
George Frederick Cotton — Secretary's Department, Admiralty
James Temple Cotton — Secretary's Department, Admiralty
Chief Carpenter John Couper  
Paul Evelyn Couratin, Department of Director of Torpedoes and Mining, Admiralty
Sarah Denton Course — Superintendent, Munition Workers' Canteen, Woolwich
Eleanor Rosina Court — Superintendent of Copying Department, Foreign Office
William Brainsford Cowcher — Inspector of Taxes, Board of Inland Revenue
Norah Louisa Cowley — Member of the British War Mission to the United States of America
Eleanor Cowling — Superintendent, Cutting-out Department, Central Workrooms, British Red Cross Society, London
Charles Edwin Cox — Director, Messrs. C. J. King & Sons, Ltd., Stevedores
Stephen Cox — Assistant Director, Explosives Storage, Explosives Supply Department, Ministry of Munitions
Captain Russell Coyne — Officer Clerk, War Office
Nora Frances Elizabeth Cracknell —  Shorthand Writer to the Chancellor of the Exchequer
Major Guy William Cranfield — Staff Officer, 2nd Class, Royal Air Force
James Crang —  General Distribution Branch; Coal Mines Department, Board of Trade
Alexander Crawford —  Messrs. Swan Hunter & Wigham Richardson
Barbara Grace Rutherford Crawford  Medical Officer at one of HM Factories, Ministry of Munitions
Lieutenant James Crawford — For an act of gallantry not in the presence of the enemy
Cecil Crawley — Voluntary Aid Detachment and Quarter Master, Cairo, British Red Cross Commission, Egypt
Isabella Warden Cree — Honorary Secretary — Headquarters Organising Clothing Committee, and Stores and Despatch Committee, Scottish Branch, British Red Cross Society
John Edwards Cresswell  Principal Medical Officer, Suez
Lucy Davis Cripps  Medical Officer at a National Filling Factory
William Thomas Critchinson — Staff Clerk, Central Control Board (Liquor Traffic)
Shipwright Lieutenant George Henry Holland Crook  Barrack Master, Portsmouth
Ada Crosby — Superintendent, Domestic Staff, City of London Auxiliary Hospital, Finsbury Square
Captain Charles Garsed Cross — For an act of gallantry not in the presence of the enemy
Minnie Eleanor Elizabeth Cross — Assistant to Lady Superintendent, Royal Arsenal, Woolwich
Lieutenant George Gorden Crowe — Officer in Charge, Red Cross Stores and Boats, Kut el Amara, Mesopotamia
Edith Miriam Croxton —  Temporary Officer, Employment Department, Ministry of Labour
Ethel Annie Lina Pender-Cudlip — Superintendent of Female Labour, Supply Reserve Depot, Deptford Cattle Market
Amelia Jane Chisholm Culbard — Organiser of Work Parties for Red Cross Work, Sphagnum Moss, and War Dressings, Scottish Branch, British Red Cross Society
Staff Paymaster John Mason Cumberland  Collector of Customs and Excise, Port of Dover
Edith Usher Cunningham — Organiser and Head of Red Cross Work. Depot, Birkenhead
William Darling Cuthbertson —  Archivist to His Britannic Majesty's Embassy, Paris
Sophie Portlock Dadson — Commandant, Gilford House Auxiliary Hospital, Roehampton
Winifred Dakyns — Assistant Director, Women's Royal Naval Service
Emily Marion Dalmahoy
Captain Norman Howard Maxwell Dalston — Quarter Master, No. 2 New Zealand General Hospital, Walton-on-Thames
Amy Daly — Commandant, The Warren Auxiliary Hospital, Leamington
The Hon. Florence Daly — Commandant, Manor House Auxiliary Hospital, Folkestone
Margaret Darby — Commandant, No. 6 Ward, Derby Royal Infirmary
Charlotte Tarry Darker — Honorary Secretary, Reading War Savings Committee
Captain Thomas Noah Darnell — Master, Mercantile Marine
Captain Sidney Lewes Dashwood —  Brigade Wireless Organisation Officer, Royal Air Force
Surendra Kumar Datta —  YMCA. Worker with Indian Troops in France
Mabel Agues Daubeny — Local War Pensions Committee, Clifton
Morgan Edwin David  Chairman, Swansea Rural Local Tribunal
Elizabeth Davidson —  Divisional Secretary for Hampstead West, County of London Branch, British Red Cross Society
John Hay Davidson — Assistant Traffic Manager, Highland Railway
Ashton Davies — Assistant to the Superintendent of the Line, Lancashire and Yorkshire Railway
David Gordon Davies —  Personal Assistant to Controller of Iron and Steel Production, Ministry of Munitions
Dorothy Kevill-Davies — Honorary Secretary, Herefordshire Horticultural Committee
Ivor Davies —  Lloyd's Agent, Algiers
Owen Davies — Steel Works Manager, Messrs. W. Gilbertson and Co., Ltd.
Thomas Davies —  Farmer
William Davies — Director, Messrs. Lane and MacAndrew
Charles Davis
Harry Lewer Davis —  Minor Staff Clerk, Contracts Branch, HM Office of Works
Owen Davis  — Commandant of Voluntary Aid Detachments, Dinas Powis and St. Fagans; in charge of Transport of Wounded, Glamorganshire
Arthur Robert Dawson —  Collector of Customs and Excise, Port of Cardiff
Frederick William Dawson — Secretary, Flour Mills Control Committee, Ministry of Food
Gertrude Margaret Day — County Organiser, Horticultural Division, Food Production Department
Mary Ariel Stewart Deacon  Medical Officer at a Filling Factory, Ministry of Munitions
Captain Basil Dean — Head of Entertainment Branch, Army and Navy Canteen Board
Major Robert Deane — Officer Commanding South African Discharge Depot, Bordon
Lieutenant Cornelius Thomas Dempsey —  Railway Traffic Officer, Australian Imperial Force
H. A. Dennis — Superintendent of a YMCA Hut at a Munitions Factory
Norah Denny — Wounded and Missing Enquiry Department, British Red Cross Society
Ethel Mary Devereux — Commandant, Tewkesbury Auxiliary Hospital, Gloucestershire
Octavius Pelly Dick — Commission Internationale de Ravitaillement
Archibald Alexander George Dickey  Organiser, Colne Auxiliary Hospital, East Lancashire
James Dickie — Dock Manager, Messrs. Palmer's Shipbuilding Co., Ltd., Hebburn
Emily Frances Dickinson — Commandant, Military Block, Essex County Hospital, Colchester
William Dickinson —  Foreman Engineer, Messrs. Swan Hunter and Wigham Richardson
The Rev. Anthony Edward Denny Disney — Chairman, Hinckley Rural Tribunal
Horace Dive —  First Class Clerk, London Telephone Service
Selina Dix — Head Mistress of the Girls' Department of the Wheatley Street Council School, Coventry
Evelyn Hilda Dixey — Quarter Master, Malvern Auxiliary Hospital
Peter Dodd —  Borough Surveyor, Wandsworth
Charles Money Dodwell — Accountant-General's Department, Admiralty
David Doig  Ex-Provost of the Burgh of Dunoon; Chairman of the Dunoon Local Tribunal
Cecile Donald — Commandant, Chadwick Auxiliary Hospital, Carlisle
Ethel Maud Donald — Personal Assistant to Deputy Controller, Gun Ammunition Manufacture, Ministry of Munitions
Lieutenant John Dooley 
Lieutenant Raymond Dooley — Adjutant of a Command Depot, Australian Imperial Force
Artificer Engineer Frederick George Doughty 
James William Dow — Assistant Works Manager, North Eastern Railway
Edward Maxwell Dower — Head of Section of Brewing Branch, Ministry of Food
John Henry Downs  —  Sub-Section Director, Iron and Steel Department, Ministry of Munitions
Frank Drake — In charge of Red Cross Motor Boat, East Africa
Lieutenant Tom Drake — For an act of gallantry not in the presence of the enemy
Henrietta Dorothy Drew — Welfare  Supervisor, The Coventry Ordnance Works, Limited
Gertrude Louise Drower —  Accountant-General's Department, Admiralty
Charles James Drummond  Vice-Chairman of the Tin Box Trade Board; Trustee of the Friendly Societies Convalescent Homes
Robert Duckworth — Superintendent, Liverpool City Police
Lieutenant Edward Joseph Scott-Dudley — Area Musketry Officer
Victoria Grant Duff — Head of Wounded and Missing Enquiry Bureau, British Red Cross Commission, Alexandria and Canal Zone
Dorothy Dufton —  Assistant, Chemical Warfare Committee, Ministry of Munitions
George Leopold Duncan —  Fourth-Class Manager, Gretna Employment Exchange, Ministry of Labour
Captain George Wilson Duncan  Ministry of National Service
Harry William Dunk — Controller of Rolling Stock, South Eastern and Chatham Railway
Walter Charles Durrant — Area Meat Agent, Ministry of Food
Henry John Eastcott — Steel Superintendent, Materials and Priority Department, Admiralty
Charles Esau Eastick — Manager and Head Chemist, Messrs. Martineau's, Ltd., Sugar Refiners
Captain Wilberforce Vaughan Eaves — Medical Officer, Royal Arsenal, Woolwich
Edward George Eddy — Honorary Secretary, Kidderminster War Savings Committee
Major Percy Granville Edge — Staff Officer, 2nd Class, Royal Air Force
Ethel Edgecombe — Honorary Lady Superintendent, Soldiers' and Sailors' Club, Liverpool
Captain Beresford Harry Huey Edkins  Staff Captain, Tank Corps Directorate
William Stanley Edmonds —  Vice-Consul in the Levant Service
Annie Doulton-Edwards — General Secretary of the Chester Council of Social Welfare
Ivor Edwards — Stores Manager to the British Red Cross Commission, East Africa
Christian Mary Egerton —  Wounded and Missing Enquiry Department, British Red Cross Society
Sydney Lipscomb Elborne —  Chemist, Inspection of High Explosives, Ministry of Munitions
Blanche Beatrice Elliott — Private Secretary to the Chief Commissioner for Trade Exemptions, Ministry of National Service
Minnie Ellis — Honorary Secretary, Portsmouth Division, British Red Cross Society
Major William Reynolds Ellison — Sub-Section Director, Trench Warfare Supply Department, Ministry of Munitions
Francis William Elsdon —  Foreman, Directorate of Inspection of Guns, Ministry of Munitions
Annie Esplin —  Labour Department, Ministry of Munitions
Ruth Frances Ethelston — Donor and Officer-in-Charge, The Boiling Auxiliary Hospital, Malpas, Cheshire
Arthur Ernest Evans  Services in connection with remounts and recruiting
Edwin Evans
Edward Victor Evans — Chief Chemist, South Metropolitan Gas Co., Ltd.
Gweneth Kate Moy-Evans — Lower Grade Clerk, Sandycroft Exchange, Ministry of Labour
S. Evans — Acting Deputy Naval Store Officer, Hong Kong
Elizabeth Mary Evens — Commandant, Foye House Auxiliary Hospital, Leigh Woods, Somersetshire
Henry Robert Fanner — Clerk to the Southend Local Tribunal
Alice Mary Fathers — Ministry of National Service
Winifred Mary  — Member of the British War Mission to the United States of America
Major Ernest Guy Fenwick —  British Remount Commission, Canada
Amy Ferguson — Personal Clerk to Chairman and Secretary of the Sugar Commission
Robert Loftus Fergusson — Sub-Section Director, Inland Transport Department, Ministry of Munitions
Walter Ferns — Section Director, Gauge Department, Ministry of Munitions
Lieutenant Pierce Ferris 
Mysie Fielden — Chairman, Shropshire Women's War. Agricultural Committee
Howard Bradley Figgis — Member of the City of London Advisory Committee
Marie Isabel Finch — Lady Clerk, War Office
John William Firth — Honorary Adviser, Light Leather Section, Department of Surveyor-General of Supply, War Office
Thomas Flavell — Manager Wheel Department, Coventry Ordnance Works
Frederic John Fleming — Works Manager, Messrs. Williamson, Limited
Lieutenant John William Fletcher — For an act of gallantry not in the presence of the enemy
John Walter Flower — Proprietor, Messrs. J. W. Flower & Co.. Augusta Frances,
Lady Augusta Fludyer — Vice-President, Uppingham Division, British Red Cross Society
Captain Peter Trant Foley — For services with the British Expeditionary Force in France
Captain Philip Edward Broadley Fooks —  Anti-Aircraft Defences, Home Forces
Phyllis Margaret Foot —  Gun Ammunition Department, Ministry of Munitions
Duncan Forbes  Medical Officer of Health, Brighton
Charles Lee des Forges — Clerk to the Rotherham Local Tribunal
Second Lieutenant James Edward Foster — For an act of gallantry not in the presence of the enemy
Thomas Burdall Foster —  Foreman in the Carriage and Wagon Department, Midland Railway
Lieutenant William Foster —  Royal Engineers For services with the Egyptian Expeditionary Force
Alexander Ferdinand Emile Foucar — Assistant Director of Finance and Shipping in the Provisions Branch, Ministry of Food
Captain Charles Henry Fowler — Section Director, Gun Manufacture Department, Ministry of Munitions
Captain William Harris Fox — Canadian Army Medical Corps
Arthur Foxall — Assistant in the Commercial Department, His Britannic Majesty's Legation, Copenhagen
Arthur Henry Foyster — Assistant Inspector, Small Arms Ammunition, Park Royal, Ministry of Munitions
Elizabeth Lydia -Francis — Lady Superintendent, YMCA Hut., Ruston Station
Guy Francis — Honorary Secretary, Denbighshire Local Representative Committee
Peter Frank — Chief Engineer at one of the establishments of Messrs. Kynoch, Ltd.
Lilian Annie Margueretta Franklin — Commandant, First Aid Nursing Yeomanry, Calais, Motor Transport Officer, Calais
K. R. Fraser — Lady Superintendent, YMCA. Hut, Orkney
Catherine Fraser  Medical Officer at one of HM Factories Ministry of Munitions
Captain Charles Gordon Freegard — For an act of gallantry not in the presence of the enemy
Captain Harry Frew — For services with the British East African Force
Major Robert Henry Frost —  Base Supply Depot, Newhaven
Captain Sydney George Frost — For services with the British Expeditionary Force in France
Leo Alfred Fullagar — Designer of HM Potash Factory
Captain James Glen Fullerton — Master of a Transport
Alfred Fyson —  First Assistant Superintendent at a Remount Depot
Helen Gadd — Commandant, Yacht Club Auxiliary Hospital and Convalescent Home, Gravesend
Captain John Russell Gales — Assistant Secretary, Navy and Army Canteen Board
Mary Louisa Wheler-Galton — Commandant, Guy's Cliffe Auxiliary Hospital, Warwick
Major Charles William Gamble — Staff Officer, 2nd Class, Royal Air Force
Winifred Game — Commandant, Ewen Hall and Ken Cottage Hospitals, High Barnet
Edmond Thomas Gann — Civil Assistant to Director-General, Army Medical Service
Tom Gardner — Director —  The West Riding Chemical Co., Ltd.
Herbert Garland —  Munitions Inventions Department
Edith Garlick — Assistant to Manager, The Birmingham Metal and Munitions Co., Ltd.
Richard Garlick —  Indoor Technical Manager, Northumberland Shipbuilding Company
Arthur Garner — Staff Officer, Stores Department, General Post Office
Charles Scott Garrett  Superintendent at one of HM Factories, Ministry of Munitions
Alice Florence, Baroness Garvagh — Organiser of Working Parties for Prisoners of War
George Geddes  Member of the Appeal Tribunal for the Sheriffdom of Elgin
Jane Gemmill — Chairman of the Partick War Savings Association
Ethel Constance Geoghegan — Private Secretary to Council Member "D," Ministry of Munitions
The Hon. Mildred Dorothea Gibbs — Administrator, Hospital for Invalid Belgians ; in charge of General Service Department, County of London Branch Office, British Red Cross Society
Grace Gibson — Honorary Stores Manager — Headquarters Clothing Depot, Scottish Branch, British Red Cross Society
Lieutenant-Colonel Orland Kingsley Gibson — Deputy Director of Dental Services, Canadian Forces
Captain William Walker Gibson —  Special employment at a Port Depot, Royal Air Force
Chief Gunner Frank Gilby 
Robert Edgar Giles — Secretary, Admiralty Committee, War Trade Board
Joseph Withers Gill — Section Director, Priority Department, Ministry of Munitions
James Gillespie —  Works Manager, Messrs. David Colville & Sons, Limited
Thomas Gillett — Managing Director, Messrs. Gillett, Stephen and Co., Ltd.
Dorothy Gladys Gillon — Member of the British War Mission to the United States of America
James Gilmour — Superintendent, Manchester City Police
William John Gilpin  Commandant, Bourne Auxiliary Hospital, South Lincolnshire
Margaret Gimson —  Leicester Local War Pensions Committee
Second Lieutenant Athelstan Louis Gladwell — For services with the British East African Force
Monica Glazebrook — Voluntary Aid Detachment Secretary, Headquarters, British Red Cross Commission, France
James Morrison Glen — Honorary Secretary, St. Helen's War Savings Committee
Captain William Purvis Glendenning — Master, Mercantile Marine
Frederick Harrison Glew —  Radium Expert to the Optical and Glassware Department, Ministry of Munitions
Lieutenant Ernest Goddard —  Eastern Command, Home Forces. Cornelius Godsell, Foreman in the Carriage Works, London and South Western Railway
Maud Mary Gold — Commandant, Braintree Union Board Room Hospital, Essex
Isobel Frances-Goldingham — Superintendent, Women's Police Service
Amy Sophia Goodall — Organiser and Commandant, Artists Rifles Hospital
John Thomas Goodwin —  The Sheepbridge Iron Company, Sheepbridge
Minnie Goodwin — Head of Red Cross Comforts Section, Manchester
Mabel Goodyear — Commandant, Lightwood Auxiliary Hospital, Smethwick. 
Isidore Heyam Gordon — Chief Transport Officer, Paris, British Red Cross Commission, France
Lisa Mary Gordon — Area Controller, Scottish Command, Queen Mary's Army Auxiliary Corps
Captain James Thomas Gorman — In charge of Clerical Establishment, War-Priorities Committee
Emmeline Mary Vallance Gorringe —  Canteen Manager at a National Projectile Factory
William Gouk —  Engine Works Manager, Messrs. Harland and Wolff
Harold Miller Gould —  District Secretary of an Army Area, in France, YMCA
Ernest Graddon — Temporary Officer, Employment Department, Ministry of Labour
Captain Ernest Grandin — Master of a Transport
Jane Marian Grantham — Commandant, Skegness Auxiliary Hospital, North Lincolnshire:
Frances Marjorie Graves —  Clerk, Foreign Office Library
Herbert Stanley Gray — Secretary, Cotton Exports Committee, War Trade Department
Percy Gray — Assistant to Assistant Director, Shipyard Labour Department, Admiralty
Robert Gray — Works Manager, Messrs. Dorman, Long and Co., Ltd.
Captain Valentine Edgar Gray —  South African Hospital and Comforts Fund
William Acheson-Gray — Secretary and Treasurer, Kingston, Surbiton, and District Red Cross Hospital
Richard Henry Greaves — Research Department, Woolwich
Alice Green — Voluntary Worker, Ministry of Labour
Arthur Stanley Green  Commandant and Medical Officer, Boutham Auxiliary Hospital, North Lincolnshire
Helen Mowbray Vincent-Green — Honorary Organizer, Wimbledon War Workers' Association
William Isaac Green — Secretary and Accountant to the British Red Cross Commissioner, Italy, Fred Greenall"
Deputy Assistant Inspector of Aeroplanes, Aeronautical Inspection, Ministry of Munitions
Charles Edward Greener — Managing Director, Messrs. W. W. Greener; Chairman, Gun Makers' Section, Chamber of Commerce, Birmingham
William Greenwood  — Brigadier, Salvation Army. 
Basil Francis Gregory — Assistant Finance Officer, Food Production Department
Frances Violet Gregory — Deputy Assistant Censor, Postal Censorship. 
John Gregory — Managing Director, Messrs. Sneyd Bycars, Limited
Mary Lizette Grey — Organiser and Commandant, 13th Northumberland V.A. Hospital
2nd Lieutenant Geoffrey Grice — For an act of gallantry not in the presence of the enemy
James Henry Griffin — Deputy Chief Constable of Hampshire
Lieutenant George Devonald Griffith — Quarter Master to an Officers' School of Instruction
Louisa Griffith — Matron, Hackney Infirmary
George Edward Griffiths  —  For services to Senior Naval Officer, West Coast of Africa
J. R. Grimsey  Chairman, Blything Local Tribunal
Frederick Grose — Honorary Inspector, Department of Surveyor-General of-Supply, War Office
Thomas Collier Grounds — Partner, Messrs. Hogg & Robinson, Admiralty Shipping Agents
Julian Charles Grumbar — Member of the Executive Committee, War Refugees Committee
James Bennett Guild — Head of Statistical Branch Section, Ministry of Food
Hannah Guilford — Member of the Nottingham Education Committee; Organiser of Public Kitchens at Elementary School Cookery Centres
Alexander Gunn — Sub-Section Director, Labour Department, Ministry of Munitions
George Gunton —  Station Master, Riverside Station, Mersey Docks and Harbour Board, Liverpool
James Gurling — Deputy Assistant Inspector of Engines, Aeronautical Inspection, Ministry of Munitions
Mabel Annie Gurney — Private Secretary to Assistant Secretary, Ministry of Food
William Jennens Hackett — Honorary Secretary, Newcastle upon Tyne-War Savings Committee
Thomas Edward Sherwood Hale — Honorary Secretary and Accountant of a YMCA, Munition Workers' Canteen
Captain Willie Hales — Assistant Inspector of Empty Shell, Ministry of Munitions
Anthony Hall —  Late Secretary, Agricultural Machinery Department, Ministry of Munitions
Alice Mary Hall — Matron, Dreadnought Seamen's Hospital, Greenwich
Captain Eric Watson Hall — For an act of gallantry not in the presence of the enemy
Second Lieutenant George Frederick Hall — For an act of gallantry not in the presence of the enemy
Henry Hall — Clerk, Local Government Board
Captain John Job Hall — Master, Mercantile Marine
Major Robert Hall —  Aircraft Park Commander, Royal Air Force
Thomas Hall —  3rd Class Manager, Lancaster Employment Exchange, Ministry of Labour
Edyth Mary Halse — Superintendent at a Munition Workers'" Canteen
Jane Ethel Hamilton —  Woman Welfare Officer, Scotland, Ministry of Munitions
Lieutenant Thomas Hamilton — For an act of gallantry not in the presence-of the enemy
Frederick Hancock — Secretary, Rouen Recreation Committee
Albert Edward Hankins —  Clerk, War Office
Sarah Ann Pike Hannaford — Matron, Poplar and Stepney Sick-Asylum
Ellen Frances Harburn —  Training Inspector, Women's Police Service
John Hardie — Assistant Superintending Engineer, General Post Office
Colonel John Stafford Goldie Harding — Recruiting Officer
Captain Henry Harrison Hardy — General Staff Officer, Third Grade, War-Office
Rowland George Barman —  Commission Internationale de Ravitaillement
William Blandford Harris — 1st Class Supplementary Clerk, Secretary's Office, General Post Office
Captain William John Harrison — Assistant, Research Department, Woolwich
John Blake Harrold — Staff Clerk, Board of Trade. 
Second Lieutenant Herbert Edward Harry— National Service Representative, Lewisham
Ernest Sidney Walter Hart — Clerk to Middlesex Appeal Tribunal
Jane Elizabeth Hart — Sheffield Local War Pensions Committee
Lilian Mary Hartland — Quarter Master, Totnes Auxiliary Hospital
Captain Alfred Harwood  — Statistical Branch, Department of Director-General, Army Medical Service
Gertrude Harwood — Lady Superintendent, Inspection of Equipment and Stores Division, Woolwich Dockyard
Charles Joseph Hassell — Collector of Customs and Excise, London Port
Alice Hasthorpe — Secretary's Department, Admiralty
Frank Hawker — Managing Director, Carpathian Silver Co., Ltd.
Frank Feodor Wynne Hawker
Harry George Hawker —  Trade Pilot, Sopwith Aviation Co., Ltd.
John Alfred Hawkins — Superintendent of Waterguard, London Port. 
Millar Wright Hawson — Supervisor and Outdoor Manager, Messrs. Rea, Coaling Agents
Althea Maud Hay — Higher Grade Woman Clerk, Ministry of Shipping
Agnes Hayes — Superintendent of Typists, Labour Department, Ministry of Munitions
Ernest Edwin Haylock — Clerk, War Office
Captain George William Haynes — Assistant Inspector of Guns, Leeds Area, Ministry of Munitions
Thomas William James Hayse —  Detective Superintendent, Swansea Borough Police
George Hazlehurst —  Dock Traffic and Railway Superintendent, Manchester Ship Canal Company
Iris Evelina Margaret Campbell Heap — Confidential Shorthand Writer to Director of Mobilization, War Office
Stephen Heap —  Navy and Army Canteen Board
Major Thomas Arthur Heath —  Superintending Clerk, Directorate of Remounts, War Office
Arthur Edward Hebron  Inspector for Shipment of Engineering Stores, War Office
Wilfred Fulleylove Helcke — Manager at one of the establishments of Messrs. Kynoch, Limited
Freda Marguerite Dorothy Henderson —  Administrative Assistant, Contracts Department, Ministry of Munitions
John Henderson — Deputy Chief Constable, North Riding Police
Mabel Henderson —  YMCA
Alexander James Hendin — Chief Draughtsman, Shipbuilding Department, Fairfield Shipbuilding and Engineering Company
William Carruthers Hetherington — Clerk, War Office
Eileen Mabel Hewitt  Medical Officer in Charge, Women's Hospital, Royal Arsenal, Woolwich
Captain Thomas Hewitt — Master, Mercantile Marine
Chief Artificer-Engineer Nicholas John Hicks 
Thomas William Hicks  Staff Medical Officer to County Director, and Officer in Charge of Red Cross Convoys, Middlesex, British Red Cross and Order of St. John of Jerusalem; Commandant, East Finchley Auxiliary Hospital
Lieutenant John Higgins  Coaling Officer, HM Dockyard, Sheerness
Catherine Octavia Higgon — Commandant and Officer-in-Charge, Cottesmore Red Cross Hospital, Pembrokeshire
Captain Ledger Story Hill — Assistant Provost Marshal, Egyptian. Expeditionary Force
Robert James Hilliar — In charge of Red Cross Ambulance and Transport Work, Worcestershire
Gladys Elizabeth Clark Hilliard — Lady Superintendent, Inspection Department, Glasgow and West of Scotland Area, Ministry of Munitions
Alice Marion, Baroness Hillingdon — Vice-President, Uxbridge District, British Red Cross Society
Captain Henry Hills — For an act of gallantry not in the presence of the enemy
Isabel Sinton Hills — Personal Assistant to one of the Financial Advisers of the Controller of Coal Mines
Major John Harris Hills — Staff Officer, 2nd Class, Royal Air Force
Captain Arthur — Instructor, Forces, Hinchliffe. Signalling Service, Home
Robert Hinchliffe — Chief Draughtsman, Messrs. Armstrong, Whitworth and Co
Ernest Edward nines — Company Commander, Norwich Special Constabulary,
Thomas Cullen Hird —  Railway Traffic Superintendent, Mersey Docks and Harbour Board, Liverpool
Second Lieutenant Lawrence Hiron Hitchcock — For an act of gallantry not in the presence of the enemy
John William Hobday —  YMCA
The Rev. Charles William Hodder — Welfare  Supervisor, Messrs. W. Denny and Brothers, Limited
Lieutenant Richard Henry Hodge 
William Anthony Hogarth — Works Manager, The Steel Company of Scotland, Limited
Mary Clare Hollins — Lady Superintendent, Rouen, YMCA
Major Reginald Holloway — Staff Officer, 2nd Class, Royal Air Force
Joseph Edward Leo Holmes, County Inspector, Royal Irish Constabulary
Herbert George Hope — Assistant Inspector of Small Arms, Woolwich Arsenal
John Hope — Assistant Deputy Chief Constable, in Charge of Special Constables, Cumberland
Francis George Hopgood —  Steward, Belgian Refugees Camp, Earl's Court
Muriel Margaret Hopkins — Head of Filing Department, Convalescent Homes for Officers Department, British Red Cross Society and Order of St. John of Jerusalem
Captain Thomas Hollis Hopkins — For services with the British Expeditionary Force in France
Captain Allen Haigh Hopkinson — Recruiting Officer
Percy Clarence Hopper —  Station Master, Victoria Station, South Eastern and Chatham Railway
Major Frederick Middleton Hornsby— National Service Representative, West Ham
Gustav Otto Henry Horstmann —  Managing Director, The Horstmann Gear Co., Ltd.
Thomas Houston — Assistant Shipyard Manager, Messrs. Harland and Wolff
Annie Howard — Chief Superintendent of Typists, Ministry of Shipping
Catharine Meriel, Lady Howard — YMCA. Worker in South Wales
William Trotman Howes, Executive Officer, Wiltshire War Agricultural Executive Committee
Christina Lamond Howie — Lady Superintendent, Post Office Canteen, Regent's Park
Frank Hewlett —  Central Organiser for Stores and Supplies, Church Army
George Wall Wall Bagot Hughes — Secretary in Charge, New Zealand YMCA in England
Marjorie Hughes — Higher Grade Woman Clerk, Ministry of Shipping
Herbert Hugill — Honorary- Secretary, Keighley War Savings Committee
William Hume —  Manager of Boiler Department, Wallsend Slipway and Engineering Co., Ltd.
Thomas Clements Humphrey, Station Master, York Station, North Eastern Railway
Albert Humphries — Assistant Superintendent, Royal Laboratory, Woolwich
Chief Gunner George Hunt 
Edith Lena Hunter — Secretary, YMCA with the Mesopotamian Expeditionary Force
George Albert Hunter — Leading Draughtsman, Messrs. Swan Hunter and Wigham Richardson. 
Edgar Barton Hunton — Inspector of Taxes, Board of Inland Revenue
Arthur Edmund Hutchins — Stores Department, Joint War Committee, British Red Cross Society and Order of St. John of Jerusalem
Stamford Hutton  Gloucester Local War Pensions Committee
Ernest Henry Huxford —  Naval Store Department, HM Dockyard, Portsmouth
Muriel Kathleen Huxter — Lady Clerk, War Office
Lieutenant Henry Maxwell Burton Inglis  —  Instructional Duties, Canadian Forces
Captain William Clarence Inglis — Headquarters Staff, Canadian Forces
Arnold Inman — Divisional Commander, Metropolitan Special Constabulary
Captain James Oliver Innes  For an act of gallantry not in the presence of the enemy
Second Lieutenant Gerald Howard Irby — For an act of gallantry not in the presence of the enemy
Captain Lionel Herbert Irvine — Area Registration Officer for Middlesex, and Assistant to the Deputy-Director of Recruiting, East Anglian Region, Ministry of National Service
Isabella Bell-Irving
Margaret Lillian Cowper Jackson — Administrative Assistant, Supplies (Aeroplanes), Aircraft Production Department, Ministry of Munitions
Roland Jackson  — Commandant, Red Cross Transport, Birkenhead
Violette Mary Jackson —  YMCA Worker in France; now in Charge of YMCA Enquiry Bureau, Trafalgar Square
Diana Lily James — Commandant, 14th Northumberland V.A. Hospital
Henry Maunsell James —  Clerk, War Office
Iris Silburn James — Head of Registry, Meat Division, Ministry of Food
Ivor Lough James — Works Manager, Messrs. W. H. Dorman and Co., Ltd.
Josephine Selina James — Honorary Organizer of the Streatham War Hospital Supply Depot
Mary Margaret Jazdouska —  In Charge of the British Soldiers' Club, Rome
Edward Compton Jefferys — Secretary to Controller, Trench Warfare Supply Department, Ministry of Munitions
Captain Rees Jenkins — Staff Captain, General Headquarters, Home Forces
Stanley Noel Jenkinson — Manager, The Edinburgh and Leith Flint Glass Manufacturing Co., Ltd.
Captain Walter Joanes —  Instructional Duties, Signal Service, Home Forces
Thomas Jobling, Foreman Blacksmith, Messrs. Swan Hunter and Wigham Richardson
Captain Cuthbert Johnson — Sub-Section Director, Optical and Glassware Department, Ministry of Munitions
Walter Johnson — Chief Engineer, Messrs. Abram Lyle & Sons, Ltd., Sugar Refiners
Walter Johnson — Acting Senior Clerk, Exchequer and Audit Department
Winifred Blanche Johnston — Naval Store Department, Admiralty
Lieutenant-Colonel Thomas Riley Jolly  Ministry of National Service
Alfred Richard Jones —  London Representative of Messrs. Guest, Keen, and Nettlefolds, Limited
Lieutenant Brainard Arthur Robinson Jones — For an act of gallantry not in the presence of the enemy
David Marteine Jones — Clerk, War Office
Dorothea Adelaide Lowry Pughe Jones — Voluntary Aid Detachment in Charge, Hostel for Relatives of Wounded, Hôtel des Anglais, Le Touquet, France
Edgar Heath-Jones —  Accountant, Central Prisoners of War Committee, British Red Cross Society
Frederick Tobias Jones — Works Manager, Ministry of Munitions Instructional Factory, Birmingham
Lieutenant Kenneth Charles Johnston Jones  For an act of gallantry not in the presence of the enemy
Lillie Highfield-Jones —  Lieutenant-Quarter Master, Women's Volunteer Reserve
John Clague Joughin — Acting Constructor, Department of Director of Warship Production, Admiralty
Margaret Beatrice Ethel Joynson. Cashier, Ministry of National Service
Captain Ambrose Keevil — For an act of gallantry not in the presence of the enemy
Mary Keightley — Head of Department, Bread Bureau for Prisoners of War, British Red Cross Society, Switzerland
William Keir —  In Charge of Cured Fish Sub-section of Fish Branch, Ministry of Food
Eleanor Sarah Kelly  Late Secretary to Matron-in-Chief, Queen Alexandra's Military Nursing Service
Henry Titus Kelly — Chief Engineer, Mercantile Marine
Henry Kemble — Honorary Secretary for Essex North, Incorporated Soldiers' and Sailors' Help Society; Local General Manager of the Eastern Counties Branch Workshops
Major Joseph Kemper — For services with the British Expeditionary Force in France
Charlotte Emma Mabel Kendall — Quarter Master. Ellesmere Auxiliary Hospital, Shropshire
Sylvia Kenrick — Quarter Master, Voluntary Aid Detachment Rest Station, Birmingham
Arthur Thomas Kent —  Engineer, Woodall-Duckham Vertical Retort and Oven Construction Co., Ltd.
Thomas Kenyon — Assistant Manager, Gun Mounting Department, Messrs. Armstrong, Whitworth & Co.
Thomas Allan Kenyon — Chief Clerk to the General Manager, Lancashire and Yorkshire Railway
Leighton Buchanan Ker —  Technical Inspector (Honorary), Department of Surveyor-General of Supply, War Office
John Charles Kew  Organiser of Belgian Relief Work, Newark
Thomas Kimber —  Ministry of National Service
James Charles Clegg Kimmins  Chairman, Stroud Rural Local Tribunal
Katherine Emma Kindersley — Organiser of Young Women's Christian Association. Munition Girls' Clubs
The Rev. Thomas King — Personal Assistant to Assistant Controller, Central Stores Department, Ministry of Munitions
William Samuel King — Civil Veterinary Surgeon, Army Veterinary Service
Robert Dixon Kingham —  Executive Officer, National War Savings Committee
John Edward Kingsland —  Medical Department, Ministry of National Service
Charles Kinloch —  Control Master, Coatbridge, North British Railway
Harry Jeoffrey Kinsman —  District Superintendent, Central Stores Department, Ministry of Munitions
George Clarvis Kirby — Manager, Wood-working Department, Messrs. Ruston Proctor and Co., Ltd.
Marion Ellen Kirby — Honorary Secretary, Hospital Bag Fund
Captain Robert Kirkpatrick — Canadian Army Medical Corps
Florence Sydney Brudenell Kirwan — Secretary, YMCA, with the Mesopotamian Expeditionary Force
Fanny Rushall Kitching  — Controller of Typists, India Office
Christina Graham Knight — Matron of Albert Dock Hospital
Captain Henry Newton Knights  Chairman of a Local Advisory Committee
Reginald Edward Knocker  Town Clerk, Dover
Alice, Lady Knox — Honorary Secretary, Basingstoke Division, British Red Cross and Order of St. John of Jerusalem
George Ernest Korn — Manager, Nitrate of Soda Department, Messrs. Antony Gibbs & Sons
Major Charles Frederick Krabbe — Staff Officer, 2nd Class, Royal Air Force
Minnie Kynoch — Member of the Dundee Food Control and Food Economy Committees
Blanche Sarah Lambert — Organiser, Young Women's Christian Association. Canteens for Army Pay Girls and Women Clerks
O. Lance — Acting Expense Accounts Officer, Malta
Lottie, Lady Arbuthnot Lane — Superintendent, Bandage Room, Central Work Rooms, British Red Cross Society
Stuart Jackson Lang —  In Charge, Advance Red Cross Stores Depot, Southern Area, France
Percy James Langley — Clerk in Charge of Accounts (Acting), Board of Agriculture and Fisheries
Herbert Langridge — Head of the Textile, Leather and Equipment Department, Commission Internationale de Ravitaillement
William Latey —  In Charge of Gun Requirements, Requirements and Statistics Department, Ministry of Munitions
Angel Lawrence Lawrence — Assistant Secretary, Central Medical War Committee
Elizabeth Mary Hilda Lawrence —  Part Founder and Superintendent of the Wigan Work Room, British Red Cross Society
Catherine Adah Kerr-Lawson — Superintendent, Queen Mary's Hostel for Nurses
Lieutenant Harold Lawson — Officer Clerk, Royal Air Force
Mildred Zacyntha Lawson —  Leeds Local War Pensions Committee
James Alfred Lawther —  Minor Staff Clerk, National Health Insurance Commission (England)
William Leach — Manager at a National Shell Factory
Loraine Lee —  Administrative Assistant, Contracts' Department, Ministry of Munitions
Gladys Mary Leeson —  Chemist at a National Filling Factory
Elsie Maude Leinster — Quarter Master, 1st Durham Auxiliary Hospital and St. John Ambulance Brigade Hospital, Saltwell Towers, Durham
Major Thomas Geoffrey Leith —  Aircraft Production Directorate and Royal Air Force
Captain John Douglas Leonard — For services with the British East African Force
George Geoffrey Lerry — Secretary, North Wales Joint Disablement Committee, Wrexham
Major Harold Octavius Lethbridge. Registrar, No. 2 Australian Auxiliary Hospital
William Letty — Principal Engineering Overseer, Eugineer-in-Chief's Department, Admiralty
John Lewis  Chairman, Carmarthen (Urban) Local Tribunal
William Reed-Lewis —  Voluntary Worker, Sussex County and Bexhill-on-Sea Belgian Refugee Committee
Wyndham Lewis — Clerk to Pontardawe Local Tribunal
Dorothy Mary Liddell — Commandant, Sherfield Manor Auxiliary Hospital, Basingstoke
Thomas Liddle  Second Class Manager, Sunderland Employment Exchange, Ministry of Labour
Mary Josephine Imelda, Countess of Limerick — Lady Superintendent, Free Buffet, London Bridge Station
Walter Lindley  Chairman, Emergency Special Constables, and Group Leader, Leicestershire Special Constabulary
Captain Alexander Dunlop Lindsay — For services with the British Expeditionary Force in France
Second Lieutenant Harold Robert Lindsay — For an act of gallantry not in the presence of the enemy
Lieutenant Herbert Westwood Ling — For an act of gallantry not in the presence of the enemy
Samuel Niman Lipman — Honorary Worker, YMCA. Munitions Department
Lieutenant William Lister — For an act of gallantry not in the presence of the enemy
Chief Gunner Harry Duncaff Lloyd 
Lieutenant Herbert Allan Lloyd — For services with the British Expeditionary Force in France
Captain William Stephen Lobb — Master, Mercantile Marine
Emily Elizabeth Loch — Lady Superintendent, YMCA, Windsor Great Park
Staff Paymaster Herbert Anthony Lockett  For services with the British Expeditionary Force in France
Florence Loftin — In Charge, Red Cross Home, Cairo Station
William Malcolm Logan — Egyptian State Railways
Mabel Sarah Lomax — Commandant and Officer-in-Charge, Linden Lea Auxiliary Hospital, Brooklands, Cheshire
Katherine Ellis Long — Commandant, Swavesey Auxiliary Hospital, Cambridgeshire
Captain William Long —  Manager. Steamship Department, Messrs. Elder and Fyffe
Percy Longmuir — Works Manager, Messrs. Samuel Fox and Co., Ltd.
Charles Ernest Lord — Clerk in Messrs. Rothschild's Bank, Paris
Thomas Lovelady — Chief Controller, London and North Western Railway
Captain William Herbert Lowe — Staff Captain, War Office
Terence Lucas — Superintendent of the Photographic Department, Ordnance Survey
Colonel Thomas Woodwright Lucas — Assistant to Officer Commanding Glamorgan and Monmouth Recruiting Area
Herbert William Luker — Assistant Director — Chief Engineer's Department, and Assistant Director, Vegetable Preservation Branch, Ministry of Food
Thomas William Lumsden, Yard Master, Gateshead, North Eastern Railway
Edmund Lund — Honorary Secretary, Ossett War Savings Committee
Janet Lund — Organiser of Beaulieu Auxiliary Hospital, Harrogate
Lieutenant Hubert Lush — For an act of gallantry not in the presence of the enemy
Shipwright Lieutenant George William Luxon 
Mellicent Lyall — Deputy Assistant Inspector of Fuzes, Ministry of Munitions
The Hon. Rosalind Margaret Lyell. Wounded and Missing Enquiry Department, British Red Cross Society
Alexander Mclntosh Lyle — Works Manager, Messrs. Abram Lyle & Sons, Ltd., Sugar Refiners
Major Patrick Lynch — Senior Clerk, Statistical Department, Board of Customs and Excise
Audrey Lynne — Honorary Secretary, Teignmouth Belgian Refugees Committee
Richard Charles Lyon  Member of the Local Tribunal of the City of Dundee
Captain John McAlister — Master of a Transport
Sibyl La Fontaine McAnally — Private Secretary to Director-General of Food Production
Ignatius James John McCarthy — Clerk, War Office
Andrew McClelland — Chief Shipyard Draughtsman, Messrs. Swan Hunter and Wigham Richardson
Mary, Lady McClure — Vice-President, Mill Hill District, British Red Cross Society
Dudley Evelyn Bruce McCorkell  County Director, City of Londonderry and County of Donegal, Irish Branch, British Red Cross Society
Major James McCrae. Commander of an Aircraft Acceptance Park, Royal Air Force
Captain Charles James Lewis McDonald — For services with the British Expeditionary Force in France
Godfrey Middleton Bosville MacDonald of the Isles, Stores Transport Officer, Boulogne, British Red Cross Commission, France
Walter James McDonnell — Staff Clerk, General Register Office
Alice Mary, Lady Patten-MacDougall — President, Argyllshire, Scottish Branch, British Red Cross Society
James Arthur Henderson Macfarlane — Clerk, Local Government Board
Emily McFerran — Organiser, Hospital War Depot, County Armagh, Irish Branch, British Red Cross Society
Captain John McGevoc — For services with the British Expeditionary Force in France
Thomas Brown McGilchrist — Chief Engineer, Mercantile Marine
Joseph MacGregor — Manager, Bull Ring Department, Smith's Dock, South Shields
Robert William MacGregor — Superintendent at one of HM Factories, Ministry of Munitions
Ethel Theresa McGuinness —  In Charge of Typing Staff, Cable Censorship, War Office
Mary Jane McGuiness — Superintendent of Women Clerks, Surveyor-General of Supplies Department, War Office
James Graham Mcilvenna — Assistant Outside Manager, Messrs. Swan Hunter and Wigham Richardson
Duncan Mackinnon Macintyre — Secretary, Glasgow Committee for the Coordination of Naval, Military and Civil Requirements
Second Lieutenant Robert William Mclntyre — For an act of gallantry not in the presence of the enemy
William Mclntyre — Assistant Traffic Manager, Highland Railway
Donald Mackenzie — Chief Engineer, Mercantile Marine
John McKenzie  Ex-Provost of the Burgh of Stornoway; Chairman of the Local Tribunal
Marion McKersie
Thomas Callender Campbell Mackie — Secretary, Scottish "Penny-a-Week" Fund, County of Dumbarton, Scottish Branch, British Red Cross Society
Edward Laurence Mackillop — Section Director, Accounts Department, Ministry of Munitions
Alister Mackinnon — Senior Assistant Inspector of Munitions, Cincinnati District, Ministry of Munitions
James MacLachlan  Honorary Secretary, Sutherland Branch, Scottish Branch, British Red Cross Society
Douglas Philip Maclagan, Motor Transport Officer, City of Edinburgh, Scottish Branch, British Red Cross Society
John McLaren — Secretary, Edinburgh Branch, Incorporated Soldiers and Sailors Help Society
Captain Charles Allan MacLean — For an act of gallantry not in the presence of the enemy
John Hair Kirk McLean — Manager, Repair Yard, Messrs. Radhead, South Shields
Margaret Eleanor Maclure — Organiser, Dover House Hospital Supply Work Rooms, Manchester
Lieutenant Albert James McMahon. Instructional Duties, Signal Service, Home Forces
Hugh McMaster  Leading Plater, Messrs. Russell & Co., Port Glasgow
Margaret Grahame Bryce MacNab — Commandant, Brechin Voluntary Aid Detachment
Captain Dougal Campbell McPherson — For services with the British Expeditionary Force in France
Thomas McPherson — Chief Draughtsman, Messrs. Wallsend Slip and Engineering Company
William McQuillen — Headmaster of Whitley and Monkseaton, Whitley South, Council School, Northumberland
Alexander McRae — Chief Shipyard Draughtsman, Messrs. Swan Hunter and Wigham Richardson
Herbert Alexander Macrae —  Japan Consular Service
Margaret McReddie — Honorary Secretary, Dartford Local War Pensions Committee
David McRobbie — District Traffic Superintendent, North British Railway
Lieutenant Herbert James Mactavish — For an act of gallantry not in the presence of the enemy
Neil McVicar — Assistant Manager, Messrs. Barclay Curie & Co.
Dorothy McWilliam — Chief Lady Welfare Supervisor at one of HM Factories, Ministry of Munitions
William Robert Magnus — Chief of the Train Control Section, Great Eastern Railway
Captain Richard Kenneth Calton Maguire — For services with the British Expeditionary Force in France
John Charles Malim — Acting Civil Engineer, Killingholme
Major Harry Ainsley Mann  Deputy Director of Army Postal Services, Egyptian Expeditionary Force
Lieutenant James Henderson Mann — For an act of gallantry not in the presence of the enemy
Lieutenant James Benjamin Manners 
Captain Lionel John Manning — Master, Mercantile Marine
Arthur Mansell — Station Master, Aldershot, London and South Western Railway
Gertrude Thompson Manwell  —  Signal Division, Admiralty
Euretta Mary Maples — Honorary Secretary, Spalding District, British Red Cross Society
Anna Elizabeth Daisy Markham — Organising Secretary, Queen Mary's Needlework Guild, York
David Gregory Marshall —  Canteen Manager, Royal Arsenal, Woolwich
Ethel Margaret Marshall — Confidential Clerk to the Deputy Director of Recruiting, North Western Region, Ministry of National Service
Lieutenant James Wright Martin — For an act of gallantry not in the presence of the enemy
Edith Martineau — Organiser, Esher Auxiliary Hospital, Surrey
Alfred Martinelli — Staff Clerk, War Office
James Irvine Orme Masson —  Research Chemist, Research Department;, Woolwich
Wilfrid John Masters —  Personal Assistant to Director of Inspection of Munitions Areas, Sheffield, Ministry of Munitions
John Masterton —  HM Senior Inspector of Mines
Lieutenant Sydney Harold Matcham — Assistant Military Secretary, Branch Headquarters, Canadian Forces
John Jephson Mathers — Superintendent, Machine and Erecting Shops, Midland Railway
Percy Ewing Matheson —  Administrative Assistant, Labour Department, Ministry of Munitions
Captain Basil Garland-Matthews — Deputy Assistant Quarter-Master-General, Headquarters, Australian Imperial Force
Thomas Herbert Mattinson — Assistant Director, Fruit Supplies and Preservation Branch, Ministry of Food
Jean Adolphe Mauger — Chief Clerk, Defence of the Realm Losses Commission
Sidney Joseph Mawle — Assistant County Director, Oxfordshire Branch, British Red Cross Society
Marjorie Maxse —  Foreign Trade Department
Frances Jane Heron-Maxwell — Vice-Chairman, West Kent Women's War Agricultural Committee
Stephen John Maxwell — Head of Special Distribution Branch, Sugar Commission
Lieutenant-Commander William Henry May 
Thomas Langley Maycock — Managing Director of Messrs. Herbert Watson & Co., Shipowners. 
Walter Alfred Meaby— Superintending Clerk, War Office
Jesse Simpson Medd — Chief Wharfinger, London and South Western Railway Docks, Southampton
Barry Meglaughlin —  Red Cross Services, Dungannon, County Tyrone, Irish Branch, British Red Cross Society
Captain Thomas Cyril Mellonie — For services with the British Expeditionary Force in France
John Mellor — Chief Clerk, Territorial Force Association of the County of Chester
John Mitchell Melville  — Clerk, War Office
John Lewis Merchant — Secretary, Bury Munitions Board of Management
2nd Lieutenant Henry Edward Merry — For services with the British Expeditionary Force in France
Captain Harold William Metcalfe — Assistant Superintendent of Works and Grounds, Chemical Warfare Department, Ministry of Munitions
Frances Mary Gore Micklethwait —  Experimental Chemical Supply Officer, Trench Warfare Supply Department, Ministry of Munitions
Lieutenant Percy Middlemas —  Gunnery Officer, Royal, Air Force (Machine Guns)
George Francis Middleton — Chief of Staff, Horticultural Division, Food Production Department
William Milburn — Assistant Controller of Registration, Ministry of National Service, Middlesbrough
Captain William Mildren — Assistant Secretary, Territorial Force Association of the West Riding of Yorkshire
Major Arnold John Miley —  Aircraft Production Directorate and Royal Air Force
Major Exley Livingston Millar  — Controller of an Aeroplane Repair Section in the Field
Minnie Milledge — Principal Clerk, Female Staff, National Health Insurance Commission (England)
Alexander Miller — Chief Engineer, Mercantile Marine
Edith Mary Miller — Commandant, The Chalet Auxiliary Hospital, Hoylake, Cheshire
Charles Augustus Mills —  Late of Indian Irrigation Service
Florence Leyland Mills — Honorary Secretary, Liverpool Centre, and Commandant, West Lancashire Reserve, St. John Ambulance Association
Margaret Smith Milne — Matron, 29 General Hospital, Salonika Expeditionary Force
Captain Francis Colin Minett — Bacteriologist, Army Veterinary Corps
2nd Lieutenant Henry William Mirehouse — For an act of gallantry not in the presence of the enemy
James Knight Mitchell —  Agent, Waterloo Station, Aberdeen, Great North of Scotland Railway
2nd Lieutenant William Boyd Mitchell — For an act of gallantry not in the presence of the enemy
Alexander Penrose David Moir — Honorary Auditor of War Savings Associations in Scotland
Captain Thomas Moir — Master, Mercantile Marine
Thomas Molyneaux —  Resident Engineer and Manager at a National Shell Factory
Captain Geoffrey Edmund Sebag-Montefiore — Assistant Provost Marshal, Egyptian Expeditionary Force
Annie Moore —  Battersea Voluntary War Workers' Association
Captain Cecil Arbuthnot St. George Moore — For an act of gallantry not in the presence of the enemy
Captain Harry Formby Moore — Adjutant of a Command Depot, Australian Imperial Force
Second Lieutenant John Moran — For an act of gallantry not in the presence of the enemy
Major Reginald Keble Morcom, Royal Engineers For services with the British Expeditionary Force, Salonika
Thomas Mordey — Head Foreman over Steel Workers, Messrs. W. Gray & Co., West Hartlepool
Bessie Morgan — Assistant Censor, Postal Censorship
Edward Barcham Morgan — Shipyard Engineer, Messrs. Swan Hunter and Wigham Richardson, Newcastle
Margaret Alice Agnes Morgan —  Coal Mines Department, Board of Trade
Helena Frances Morle — Superintendent of Women Clerks in the Accountant-General's Department, Board of Education
Lieutenant Percy Morrey — For an act of gallantry not in the presence of the enemy
Arthur Morris — Assistant to General Manager, Messrs. Armstrong, Whitworth & Co.
Charles Edward Morris —  Engineer, Raw Materials Branch, Explosives Supply Department, Ministry of Munitions
Miss. Etheldreda Morris — Welfare  Superintendent at a National Filling Factory
Florence Muriel Morris  Commandant and Medical Officer-in-Charge, Paignton Auxiliary Hospital, Devonshire
Hardwick Grant Morris —  Engineer to the Cairo Water Works
Jean Anderson Morris — Private Secretary to the Head of the Finance Section, Foreign Trade Department
William Anthony Morris — Assistant to Administrative Officer, Inspection Department, Woolwich, Ministry of Munitions
James Augustus Morrison— Master of the Homes and Hospital, Incorporated Soldiers and Sailors Society
John Morrison — Secretary to the District Agricultural Committee, Kirkcudbrightshire
John Morrison — Works Manager, Shipyard Department, Messrs. Harland & Wolff
Captain Leopold George Esmond Morse. Messrs. Firth & Son, Limited
Lieutenant Clifford Charles Mortimore —  Department of Director of Statistics, Admiralty
Elsie Eleanor Morton — Honorary Organising Secretary, Deptford War Hospital Supply Depot
Lieutenant John Darnley Mitford Morton — For an act of gallantry not in the presence of the enemy
Arthur Mousley — Manager of Messrs. Charles Winn & Co., Birmingham
Annie Angus Mowat — Higher Grade Woman Clerk, Ministry of Shipping
Edith Emily Mudd — Lady Superintendent, Park Royal Canteen, Ministry of Munitions
Percy Maxwell-Muller — Works Manager at one of the establishments of Messrs. Vickers, Limited
Lieutenant Clifford Victor Mulligan — For an act of gallantry not in the presence of the enemy
George William Mullins —  Kings Norton Metal Company, Birmingham
Ernest Henry Murrant —  Private Secretary to Managing Director of Messrs. Furness, Withy & Co.
Captain Arthur Stanley Gordon Musgrave — For services with the Egyptian Expeditionary Force
Agnes Rose Myatt — Principal of the Women's Staff, War Trade Statistical Department
Captain Charles James Napier — For services with the British Expeditionary Force in France
Emily Caroline Napier — Commandant, Parish Hall Auxiliary Hospital, Waterlopville, Hampshire
2nd Lieutenant James Ross Napier  For an act of gallantry not in the presence of the enemy
Blanche Thompson Nash —  Woman's Welfare Supervisor, Ministry of Shipping
Lieutenant Frank Horace Elliott Nash  Department of the Deputy Controller for Armament Production, Admiralty
Henry Nash — Assistant Recruiting Officer, Bristol, Ministry of National Service
William James Naylor — Superintendent, Cheshire Constabulary
Captain Eric Vansittart Ernest Neill —  Second in Command of a Training Battalion, Australian Imperial Force
Maria Elizabeth Nevile — Voluntary Worker for Prevention and Relief of Distress, Lincoln
John Walker Newall — Manager, Gauge and other Departments, at a National Shell Factory
Charles Wemyss Newton — In charge of Munition Workers Hostel and Canteen
John Charles Newton, Atlantic Coaling Company, Sierra Leone
George Thomas Nicholls, Accountant, Board of Inland Revenue
Miss Dorothea Marian Nichols —  Supervisor of the Central Registry, Ministry of National Service
Florence Isabel Nicholson — Commandant, Balrath Auxiliary Hospital, Barry, Kells, County Meath
Lieutenant-Colonel Malcolm Nicholson — Staff Officer, 2nd Class, Royal Air Force
Reginald Nicholson — Assistant Director, Women's Branch, Food Production Department
Samuel Thomas Nicholson — Honorary Secretary, National Chamber of Trade
Quintin Anderson Nicol  — Transport Officer, County of Durham, British Red Cross and Order of St. John of Jerusalem
Charles Bain Niven — Chief Engineer, Mercantile Marine
Frederick Worth Noal —  Marine Superintendent, Great Eastern Railway, Parkeston Quay, Harwich
Lieutenant William Herbert Novis — Secretary and Assistant to County Director, Shropshire, British Red Cross and Order of St. John of Jerusalem
Alfred James Offord — Superintendent and Chief Clerk, Essex County Police
Captain Alan Grant Ogilvie — For services with the British Expeditionary Force, Salonika
Diana Elizabeth Maria Ogilvy — Commandant, Battenhall Auxiliary Hospital, Worcestershire
Norman Oldfield — Secretary, Somerset War Agricultural Executive Committee
George Edward Oldmeadow — Sub-Section Director, Labour Department, Ministry of Munitions
Annie Gordon Olive — Commandant, "Holmdene" Auxiliary Hospital, Leamington
John David Oliver, Foreman of Machine Shop, Messrs. Emerson, Walker and Thompson, Gateshead
Chief Gunner Daniel John O'Meara 
Annie Ormerod — Lady Superintendent and Quarter Master, Castleton House Auxiliary Hospital, Castleton, East Lancashire
Albert Alfred Osborne  Commandant and Medical Officer-in-Charge, Ilfracombe Auxiliary Hospital, Devonshire
Rosabelle Osborne — Principal Matron, British Salonika Force
Lieutenant William Lewis Ost  Boom Defence Officer, Queenstown
Gerald Hendon O'Sullivan —  Messrs. J.O. Sullivan & Sons
Haidee Maria Outram — Commandant, Kirkburton Auxiliary Hospital, Huddersfield
Lieutenant George Stanley Oxburgh —  Historical Section, Committee of Imperial Defence
Captain Thomas Benjamin Oxland — Master of a Transport
Henry Walter Percy Packer —  Priority Department, Ministry of Munitions
Agnes Margaret Page — Higher Grade Woman Clerk, Ministry of Shipping
Helen Painting — Confidential Shorthand Writer, War Office
Helen Grace Palin — Matron, 21st Stationary Hospital, Salonika Expeditionary Force
Vincent Paling — Secretary, Gun Supply Section, Ministry of Munitions
Clara Palmer —  British soldiers' Club, Rome
Lieutenant Hubert Leslie Palmer — For an act of gallantry not in the presence of the enemy
Captain William Falmer —  Army Gymnastic Staff
Charles Parker — Chief Clerk, Trains Office, London and North Western Railway
Major James Edward Parkin — Royal Air Force, Recruits Training Depot
James Parkinson — Inspector, Liverpool City Police; Inspector of Explosives in the Liverpool Dock Area
Mary Evelyn Parry — Joint Women's Voluntary Aid Detachment Department, Devonshire House
Lieutenant James Riddick Partington —  Munitions Inventions Department
Clara Poynton Patenall — Organiser and Commandant, Higham Ferrers Auxiliary Hospital, Northamptonshire
Captain Neil James Kennedy-Cochran-Patrick —  Appeal National Service Representative, Renfrewshire
Captain George Payne —  Army Ordnance Department
Herbert Payne — Managing Director, Messrs. Payne & Sons (Otley) Limited
Lily Payne — In charge of Typing Section, War Office Annexe
Alice Evelyn Peacock — Voluntary Worker in the Calling-up Branch, Brighton Recruiting Office
May Beauchamp Peacock — Voluntary Worker in the Calling-up Branch, Brighton Recruiting Office
John Pearce —  Ministry of National Service
John Howard Pearson — Honorary Secretary, Dudley War Savings Committee
Charles Waldegrave Pennell  Deputy Chief Officer and Chief Superintendent, Lincoln City Special Constabulary
Frederick Pennell— Master Stevedore
Lieutenant Geoffrey Arthur Peppercorn  Railway Materials Department Ministry of Munitions
Ada Stair Perry — Welfare  Supervisor, Messrs. Curtis and Harvey Ltd.
Joseph Hind Pescod — Chief Draughtsman, Warship Drawing Office, Messrs. Swan Hunter and Wigham Richardson
Fanny Elizabeth Phelps — Superintendent at a Munition Workers' Canteen
Cecilia Lucks Phillips — Vice-President, Thetford Division, British Red Cross Society
Captain George Lort Phillips — Commandant, Lewes Detention Barracks
2nd Lieutenant Richard Nelson Picken — For an act of gallantry not in the presence of the enemy
Lieutenant Edward Fitzgerald Samuel Pickering — Adjutant of a School of Instruction for Officers
Henrietta Sybil Douglas Picot — Assistant, Bread Bureau for Prisoners of War, British Red Cross Society, Switzerland
Leonard Gamier Pilkington — Secretary, YMCA. Employment Bureau
Shipwright Lieutenant John Henry Pine  Barrack Master, Chatham
Arthur Joseph Pitman — Acting Chief Examiner, War Office
Nellie Flora Pitt — In charge of Typing Establishment, Park Buildings, War Office
Major William Edward Plaister — Staff Officer, 2nd Class, Royal Air Force
2nd Lieutenant Oswald Gordon Platt  For an act of gallantry not in the presence of the enemy
Herbert Poate — Head of Curative Workshops, Military Orthopaedic Hospital, Shepherd's Bush
Dorothy Martha Pocock. Night Superintendent, Young Women's Christian Association. Canteen at a Munitions Factory
Arthur Reginald Poole, Timber Supplies Department, Board of Trade
Arthur Milnes Pooley, Mechanical Warfare Department, Ministry of Munitions
James Ablitt Pasifull Powell — Superintendent, Metropolitan Police
Leslie Powne  Commandant and Medical Officer-in-Charge, Crediton Auxiliary Hospital, Devonshire
Captain William Francis Prentice — Technical Officer, Royal Air Force, and Directorate of Aircraft Production
Mark Rushworth Preston — Secretary, Liverpool Committee for the Co-ordination of Naval, Military and Civil Requirements; Secretary, Liverpool Port Labour Committee
William Edward Preston — Head of Malt and Liquor Section, Brewing Branch, Ministry of Food
James Beer Price  —  For services with the British Expeditionary Force in France
Violet Amelia Price — Member of the British War Mission to the United States of America
Alice Maud Prichard — Commandant, Kitebrook Auxiliary Hospital, Moreton-in-Marsh, Gloucestershire
Captain Charles Edmond Prince. Wireless Experimental Officer, 1st Class, Royal Air Force
Edwin James Prince, Station Master, Waterloo Station, London and South Western Railway
Harriet Gertrude Proger — Commandant, St. Fagan's Auxiliary Hospital, near Cardiff
Albert Edward Prowse — Superintendent of a Workers Settlement at a Munitions Factory
Ethne Philippa Pryor — Honorary Secretary, Prisoners of War Department, Royal Air Force Aid Committee
William Frederick Purvis —  Information Officer, Food Production Department
Captain William Thomas Pyke — Assistant Secretary, Territorial Force Association of the County of Southampton
John James Quann — Clerk, War Office
Eliza Ellen Quick — Honorary Secretary, Warwickshire Local War Pensions Committee
Herbert John Quick —  Technical Adviser and Engineering Manager, Messrs. Harfield, Blaydon-on-Tyne
Sidney Curtis Quick  — Commandant of Voluntary Aid Detach ments, undertaking Disembarkation of Wounded at Southampton
Dorothy Bradford — Honorary Quarter Master and Registrar, Military Wards, General Auxiliary Hospital, Nottingham
Joseph Charles Radford — Egyptian State Railways
Captain William Oswell Raikes  — Staff Officer, 2nd Class, Training Division, Royal Air Force
Thomas Rainford — Manager, Messrs. Worms & Co., Marseilles
Edmund Cecil Ramsbottom —  Labour Statistics Department, Ministry of Labour
Francis Graham Ramsay —  Executive Cable Engineer, General Post Office
William Rankine — Principal, London County Council Technical School, Shoreditch
Major Alfred Edward Rann  Officer Commanding a South African Heavy Artillery Depot
Gunner Sydney Ratcliff 
Lieutenant Norman Vincent Raven — Assistant Inspector, Small Arms, U.S.A., Ministry of Munitions
Leonard Rawlinson — Town Clerk, Leamington; Clerk to the Local Tribunal
Ralph George Joynson Rawlinson — Divisional Commander, Metropolitan Special Constabulary
Captain Robert Osmond Raynor — Section Director, Accounts Department, Ministry of Munitions
Thomas Reader — Clerk, War Office
Ernest Alfred Reavill — Assistant Manager, Royal Small Arms Factory, Ministry of Munitions
Edwin Reed — Acting Examiner of Naval Work on Staff of Inspector of Steel, Admiralty
Ernest Wilmot Rees — Assistant Engineer, HM Office of Works
Henry Rees — Secretary to the Parliamentary Recruiting Committee and National Service Committee
T. E. Rees
William Booth Reeve  Mayor of Margate
Lieutenant-Commander George Reeves 
Ethel Maude Reynolds —  Examiner, Effects Branch, War Office
Lieutenant Percival Richard Richards — For services with the British Expeditionary Force in France
The Rev. Albert Thomas Richardson —  Vicar of Bradford-on-Avon
Annie Bertha Richardson — Assistant County Director for General Service, Oxfordshire Branch, British Red Cross Society
Harry Richardson —  Construction Works Manager, Messrs. Trollope and Colls
Mary Anita Richardson
Lieutenant Eric Keightley Rideal —  Munitions Inventions Department
Thomas Mortimer Riordan — Clerk, War Office
Lieutenant John Ritchie —  Second in Command of Army Medical Store, Woolwich
Mary Thompson Ritchings  Medical Officer-in-Charge, YMCA. Auxiliary Hospital, Swansea
David Richard Roberts — Sub-Section Director, Central Stores Department, Ministry of Munitions
Gomer Roberts  Executive Officer, Denbigh War Agricultural Executive Committee
Henry David Roberts — Honorary Secretary, Inter-Allied Exhibition, Ministry of Pensions
Herbert Charles Roberts, Late Stores Manager to the British Red Cross Commission, East Africa
Lieutenant-Commander John Roberts  Admiralty Mail Officer, Chatham
Archibald Campbell Robertson  Secretary, Medical Department, Ministry of National Service
Richard Frederick Robertson — Acting Contract Officer, Contract Department, Admiralty
Thomas Ingle Robinson — Clerk, War Office
James Allison Rodger —  Marine Superintending Engineer, Great Central Railway, Grimsby
Robert Rodham — Works Manager at a National Shell Factory
Samuel Roebuck  Junior General Secretary, Yorkshire Miners' Association
Frederick Charles Rogers — Manager at a National Shell Factory
Henry Rogers — Works Manager, The King's Norton Metal Co., Ltd.
Herbert Rogers — Acting Chief Examiner, Exchequer and Audit Department
Chief Carpenter James George Rogers 
Joan Rogers — Lady Superintendent, Army Pay Department
Leila Harriette Romer — Lady Superintendent, YMCA Hut, Kensington High Street
Captain James Rose —  In Charge of an Ammunition Depot, attached to a Filling Factory
Captain James Maxwell Ross  County Director, Dumfries, Scottish Branch, British Red Cross Society
John David McBeath Ross — Assistant Research Chemist, Chemical. Warfare Department, Ministry of Munitions
Stella Maude Dalrymple Ross — Honorary Secretary, Southfield Auxiliary-Hospital, Duns, Berwickshire
John William Rowe — Superintendent at one of HM Magazines, Ministry of Munitions
Mabel Ruth Rowe —  Comforts Branch of the Exeter Association of Voluntary Workers
William George Rowe — Assistant Shipyard Manager, Messrs. J.S. White & Co., Cowes
Joseph Samuel Rowland  Chairman of Burton-on-Trent Local Tribunal and Belgian Refugees Committee — Chairman of Recruiting Committee
Captain Charles Donovan Rowley — Sub-Section Director, Gun Ammunition Filling Department, Ministry of Munitions
Elizabeth Lilian Royce — Lady Superintendent, YMCA, Havre
Louise Alice Rudge — Member of the British War Mission to the United States of America
Henry Weir Runciman — Head Foreman, Messrs. Donkins & Co., Newcastle
Artificer Engineer Thomas Arthur Edwin Rush 
Diana Russell — Secretary, Wounded and Missing Enquiry Department, British Red Cross Commission, France
Rachel Augusta Russell — Private Secretary to the Secretary and Assistant Secretary, Ministry of Munitions
William Sidney Russell — Secretary and Manager, Leicester Armaments Group
Henry Thomas Ruston — Chief Registrar, Sugar Commission
George Henry Rutland — Chief Draughtsman, Warship Department, Messrs. Hawthorn, Leslie & Co.
Allen Molyneux Baxter Sage — Clerk, War Office
William Henry Salter — Assistant, Parliamentary and General Department, Ministry of Munitions
William Sambridge, Foreman Carpenter, Messrs. Swan Hunter and Wigham Richardson, Newcastle
Second Lieutenant Leslie Sample.For an act of gallantry not in the presence of the enemy
Lieutenant Howard Sampson — For an act of gallantry not in the presence of the enemy
Elizabeth Sandford — Limenaria Hospital and Sanatorium, Thasos
Henry John Sankey — Assistant to Director of Inspection of Guns,' Ministry of Munitions
Olga Joyce Forbes Sargint — Assistant Executive Officer, National War Savings Committee
Ina Saunders — Voluntary Aid Detachment, New Zealand Expeditionary Force
Major John Clifford Savage — Staff Officer, 2nd Class, Royal Air Force
Harold Edward Sayer — Sub-Section Director, Munitions Accounts, Ministry of Munitions
Fred Scarfe — Chief Clerk in the Traffic Office, Great Northern Railway
Albert Edward Scarlett — Clerk to Depwade Local Tribunal
Agnes Scatterty — Commandant, Spencer Street Auxiliary Hospital, Keighley
James Rimmer Schofield — Principal and Director of the South Wales Wireless Training College
Eloise Irene Scott of Messrs. C. Churchill and Co., Ltd.
Gladys Mary Scott — In charge of Red Cross Invalid Kitchen, 29th General Hospital, Salonika
James Scott — Deputy Assistant Inspector of Aeroplanes, Aeronautical Inspection, Ministry of Munitions
John Scott — Joint Honorary Secretary, Sheffield War Savings Committee
Muriel Elena Scott —  Unit Administrator, Queen Mary's Army Auxiliary Corps
Thomas Scowcroft  Assistant County Director for Boltou District, East Lancashire, British Red Cross and Order of St. John of Jerusalem
Shipwright Lieutenant George Edward Segrue  Mechanical Training Establishment Royal Navy Barracks, Chatham
Lieutenant Foster James Semmons —  Anti-Aircraft Defences, Home Forces
Agnes Hannah Settle — Commandant, Horncastle Auxiliary Hospital, North Lincolnshire
Alfred Charles Seward — Head of Staff of Messrs. Mathwin's
Frank Seymour — Deputy Assistant Inspector of Aeroplanes, Aeronautical Inspection, Ministry of Munitions
Kathleen Shackleton —  Coal Mines Department, Board of Trade
Major Gerald Whittaker Sharp —  Danger Officer at a National Filling Factory; for gallantry on the occasion of serious fire and explosion
Lieutenant William Sharp — For services with the British Expeditionary Force in France
James Edward Sharpe — Assistant to the Traffic Manager, Great Eastern Railway
Gertrude Shaw — Assistant Secretary, YMCA. Munitions Department
Herbert Shaw, District Surveyor, Ilford
Katherine Shaw. Founder of the Great Yarmouth Association of Voluntary Workers
George Nuttall Shawcross — Acting Locomotive Works Manager, Lancashire and Yorkshire Railway
Mary Edith Sheffield — Welfare  Superintendent, The Thames Ammunition Works, Limited
Lieutenant John Short — For services with the British Expeditionary Force in France
Emily Frances Siddon — President, Soldiers' and Sailors' Families Association, Huddersfield
Annie Louise Simpson — Personal Shorthand Writer to the Prime Minister
Major Geoffrey Hugh Simpson — For services with the Egyptian Expeditionary Force
Captain Herbert Simpson  Personal Assistant to the Deputy Chief of the Imperial General Staff
Richard Arbuthnot Simson — Divisional Commander, Metropolitan Special Constabulary
Edward Sinclair —  Commissioned Master at Arms; Chief of Police, Royal Navy Barracks, Portsmouth
Captain Samuel Christian Sinclair —  Postal Services for Indian Troops, Egyptian Expeditionary Force
William Simmonds Skelton  Voluntary Worker, Ministry of Labour
Donald McLean Skiffington —  Outside Manager, Shipyard Department, Messrs. John Brown & Co.
Lieutenant Herbert Fenton Skinner — For services with the British Expeditionary Force in France
Ernest Clement Skurray  Tractor Representative for Wiltshire, Food Production Department
George Frederick Slade  Clerk to Wallingford Rural Tribunal and Crowmarsh Local Tribunal
Bertram Haylock Smale — Deputy Assistant Inspector of Aeroplanes, Aeronautical Inspection, Ministry of Munitions
Robert Townsend Smallbones —  British Vice-Consul at Stavanger, Norway
Henry Sankey Smallwood — Executive Officer, Ministry of Munitions Area Clearing House, Birmingham
Captain Charles Frederick Smedley — Quarter Master, New Zealand Convalescent Hospital, Hornchurch
Olive Truda Marsden-Smedley — Assistant in Food Survey Board, Ministry of Food
William Henry Smedley —  Police Court Missionary, Grimsby
Lieutenant Allan Bertram Smith — For an act of gallantry not in the presence of the enemy
Annie Hansley Smith — Head of Filing and Registry Department, Joint Women's Voluntary Aid Detachment Department, Devonshire House
Aubrey Golding Smith — Voluntary Driver, Motor Ambulance Convoy, British Red Cross Commission, Italy
Constance Maitland Wilson Smith — Commandant, Hayle Place Auxiliary Hospital, Maidstone
Dempster Smith —  Messrs. Mirlees, Bickerton and Day
Major Fred John Smith —  YMCA Worker with Canadian Forces in England
Second Lieutenant George Geoffrey Smith —  Editor of The Motor Cycle; services in connection with recruiting
Herbert Edwin Smith — Divisional Commander, Metropolitan Special Constabulary
Anne Huntingdon Melville Smith — Honorary Women's Welfare Supervisor, The King's Norton Metal Co., Ltd.
Second Lieutenant James Albert Smith — For an act of gallantry not in the presence of the enemy
St. Osyth Mahala Eustace Smith — Honorary Secretary, Essex Local War Pensions Committee
Honorary Sub-Lieutenant Walter Smithers 
Captain Alfred Smy — Master, Mercantile Marine
Albert Charles Butler-Smythe  Member of a Recruiting Medical Board
Adam Currie Snaith — Honorary Secretary, Brandon and Byshottles War Savings Committee
Captain Fred Hibbard Songhurst — Royal Air Force, in charge of Workshops in an Overseas Aircraft Park
Gertrude Vera Sorby. Administrative Assistant, Supplies (Aeroplanes), Aircraft Production Department, Ministry of Munitions
Captain John Percival Spanton. British Remount Commission, Canada
Stanley Sparkes — Secretary, Mediterranean Conference, Ministry of Shipping
Caroline Mary Spence — Assistant Commandant and Quarter Master, John Leigh Memorial Auxiliary Hospital for Officers, Altrincham
Henry Bath Spencer — Assistant Inspector of Cartridges, Ministry of Munitions
John Hayward Spencer — Deputy Assistant Inspector of Aeroplanes, Aeronautical Inspection, Ministry of Munitions
Alfred Spicer — Steel Works Superintendent, The Port Talbot Steel Co., Ltd.
Gavin Spiers — Head Foreman over Steel Workers, Messrs. W. Gray & Co., West Hartlepool
Armande Spikins — Lady Driver, New Zealand Motor Transport
Miss Eva Harvey Spite — Secretary to the Purchasing Committee of the-Royal Commission on Wheat Supplies
Lieutenant Reginald Vernon Stafford — For an act of gallantry not in the presence of the enemy
Major George Ernest Stagg — Staff Officer, 2nd Class, Royal Air Force
Gladys Margaret Stainforth — Lady Superintendent, YMCA, Harfleur District
Caroline Elinor Stammers — Organiser, Ladies' Red Cross Workroom, Alexandria
Bernard Coatsworth Stampe — Manager, Messrs. T. C. Thompson & Son
Leonard Stanley, Accountant, Manchester Munitions Board of Management
Captain Frederick William Stanton. Army Service Corps
Reginald George Stapledon — Director, Seed Testing Station, Food Production Department
Frank Tapscott Stark — Assistant Manager, Alexandra Towing Company, Liverpool
John Stark — Chief Clerk, and Chief Superintendent, City of London Police
George Sydney Staunton — Superintendent and Assistant Chief Constable, East Suffolk Police
Ethel Mary Steeds — Personal Clerk to the Director of General Branch, Local Authorities Division, Ministry of Food
Charles Walter Steel — Divisional Red Cross Secretary, Norwich; Officer commanding Norwich Transport Corps
Captain Henry Brown Torrie Stephen — For an act of gallantry not in the presence of the enemy
Amy Frances Caroline Stephens —   Accountant-General's Department, Admiralty
Marjory Stephenson — Superintendent of Red Cross Sisters' Convalescent Home, Salonika
John Home Stevenson
Samuel Stevenson  Messrs. Stevenson & Co., Glasgow
Mary Jane Stewart — Superintendent of Surgical Dressings, Central Red Cross Work Rooms
Marjorie Ellen Still — Honorary Secretary, Lambeth War Pensions Sub-Committee
2nd Lieutenant Charles Frederick Stirling — For an act of gallantry not in the presence of the enemy
Lieutenant John Wilkie Stoddard — For an act of gallantry not in the presence of the enemy
Isaac Stone — Senior Construction Works Manager, Messrs. Cubitt & Co.
Henry Storey —  Collector of Fishery Statistics of Board of Agriculture and Fisheries at Lowestoft
Maud Eleanor Stoughton —   War Office
Lieutenant Frederick Stovell — For services with the Egyptian Expeditionary Force
Tames Strachan — Acting Carriage Works Manager, London & North Western Railway
Matthew Smellie Strang, District Superintendent, North British Railway
Lieutenant Cyril John Strother — Technical Officer (Wireless Duties), Royal Air Force
Florence Louise, Lady Stuart —  Department of HM Procurator-General, Intelligence Branch
George Barclay Stuart — Section Director, Finance Department, Ministry of Munitions
Arthur Hope Sturdee — Manager, Small Tool Department, Coventry Ordnance Works, Limited
Ethel Hariette Sturt —   Late Assistant Commandant, Lytchett Manor Auxiliary Hospital, Dorsetshire
Joseph Sullivan  —  County Councillor of Lanarkshire
Ada Jane Summers — Organiser of Homes for Refugees, Stalybridge
John Hamer Sutcliffe — Superintendent, Army Spectacle Depot
John Sutherland — Section Manager at one of HM Factories, Ministry of Munitions
Cecil Norman Stafford Sutton
John Joseph Sutton — Secretary, Grimsby Fishing Vessel Owners Exchange Co., Ltd.
David Swanson, Messrs. David Rowan & Co., Glasgow
Robert William Swinnerton  Chairman, Nuneaton Rural Tribunal
Joseph Percival Sykes —   First Class Clerk, Ministry of Pensions
William Henry Sykes —   Late Headmaster of Wapping Road Council School, Bradford
Albert James Sylvester —   Private Secretary to the Secretary to the War Cabinet
William Frederick Symons — Senior Commandant, London Red Cross Ambulance Column
Anna Alma Tadema — Voluntary Worker, War Refugees Committee
James Tait — Manager, Messrs. T. W. Ridley & Sons
Albert William Tangye —   Chemist, Messrs. Brunner, Mond and Co., Ltd.
Edward Tanner, Station Master, Littlehampton, London, Brighton and South Coast Railway
Bramwell Taylor —   Adjutant, Salvation Army; in charge of Salvation Army Ambulance Cars in France
Colonel Herbert Brooke-Taylor  Ministry of National Service
Captain Frank Gellie Taylor — Quarter Master-General's Department, War Office
Captain Geoffrey Fell Taylor — For an act of gallantry not in the presence of the enemy
Harold Victor Taylor — Inspector, Supplies Division, Food Production Department
Captain Louis Henry Taylor — Master of a Transport
Richard Francis Taylor — Staff Officer, Census of Production Office
Mary Jessie Tebbutt — Voluntary Red Cross Worker, Southampton
Katherine Rose Tebbutt — Voluntary Red Cross Worker, Southampton
Kenneth John Marmaduke Teesdale — Sub-Section Director, Allied Branch, Requirements and Statistics Department, Ministry of Munitions
Robert Temple —   Inventor
Frank Edward Seymour Thake  — Commandant in Charge of Motor Ambulance Transport, Reading
Charles Henry Gordon Eyre Theobald —   Wounded and Missing Enquiry Department, British Red Cross Society
Captain The Hon. Percy Mansfield Thesiger — Royal Air Force, conducting an Equipment Branch in the Field
Lieutenant Constantine Thirkell —   Red Cross Transport Officer, County of Northumberland
William Thirkell — Clerk, War Office
Bert Thomas — Honorary Cartoonist, National War Sayings Committee
Captain Edward Thomas — Master, Mercantile Marine
Lieutenant Francis Henry Hale Thomas — Adjutant and Quarter Master Senior Officers' School
Harry Jones Thomas, Civilian Acting Paymaster, Army Pay Department
Lieutenant Sidney Arthur Thomas — Chief Clerk, Ordnance Committee, Ministry of Munitions
William Gearing Thomas —  Mineral Oil Production Department, Ministry of Munitions
William Henry Thomas —  National Service Representative, Middlesbrough
Edward Thompson —  Foreman Moulder, Messrs. Blair & Co., Stockton
Jessie Catherine Thompson —  Housekeeper, No. 2 New Zealand General Hospital
Major Robert Broadwell Thompson —  Field Cashier, Canadian Army Pay Corps
William Henry Thompson —  District Superintendent, Great Southern and Western Railway Company of Ireland, Cork
William Nelson Thompson —  Wharfinger, Cardiff Railway Company
James Thomson —  Outdoor Assistant to the Superintendent of the Line, Glasgow and South-Western Railway
James Miln Thomson — Manager, Royal Gun Powder Factory, Ministry of Munitions
Beatrice Mary Compton Thornhill — Organiser, Red Cross Depot, Bury St. Edmund
John Sinclair Thyne — Manager, Messrs. S. P. Austin & Son, Sunderland
Frank Parry Relf Tibbles — Sub-Section Director, Machine Tool Department, Ministry of Munitions
Doris Ada Tiffen —  Administrative Assistant, Department of Controller-General for Merchant Shipbuilding, Admiralty
John Tinn — Works Manager, Messrs. R. Hornsby & Co., Grantham
Ethel Annie Tizard — Secretary to Matron-in-Chief, Queen Alexandra's Imperial Military Nursing Service
Edith Mary Elizabeth Todd — Matron, Royal Arsenal Hospital, Woolwich
Emma Anne Toller — Lady Superintendent, YMCA, Paddington Station
Dora Sloane Tomkinson —  Assistant, Establishment Branch, Ministry of Munitions
James Tonner  —  County Councillor of Lanarkshire
Louis Frederick Tooth — Superintendent, Meter Department, Commercial Gas Company
Harry Topham — Assistant Inspector of Steel, Admiralty
Christopher Edward Town — Secretary, Tea Control Committee, Ministry of Food
Margery Townshend — Member of the British War Mission to the United States of America
Walter Trathan — Staff Clerk, War Office
2nd Lieutenant Francis James Treanor — For an act of gallantry not in the presence of the enemy
Captain John Linton Treloar — Officer Commanding Australian War Records Section, Australian Imperial Force
William Ewart Gladstone Trigg — Superintendent and Chief Clerk, Lincolnshire Police
Alice Trounce Superintendent at a Munition Workers' Canteen
George John Tucker — In charge of Red Cross Motor Ambulance work, Liverpool
Ina Aveling Tucker — Commandant, Hart House Auxiliary Hospital, Burnham, Somerset
George Drummond Turnbull — Chief Engineer, Messrs. W. S. Miller & Co.
Adolphus Frederick Franklyn Turner — Clerk, War Office. 
Cameron Turner — Works Manager, Messrs. McKie & Baxter, Glasgow
Catherine Mary Turner — Commandant, Wall Hall Auxiliary Hospital, Hertfordshire
Robert Reginald Johnston Turner — Secretary, Munitions Works Board
William Walker Turner, Accountant, Stores Department, British Red Cross Society Headquarters
S. Tweedale —  Messrs. Tweedale & Smalley, Manchester
Captain William Glenholme Tweedy — Quarter Master, No. 1 New Zealand General Hospital
2nd Lieutenant Arthur Henry Tytherleigh — For an act of gallantry not in the presence of the enemy
Chief Gunner Walter Jefferey Uden 
Percy Umney — Clerk to the Richmond Guardians, Surrey
Rachel Lilian May Usher — Member of the British War Mission to the United States of America
William Le Vack — Principal, Statistical1 Branch, War Trade Department
Sybil Vane — Private Secretary to the Director-General of National Labour Supply, Ministry of National Service
Lieutenant Arthur Percy Vanneck — Anti-Aircraft Defences, Home Forces
Captain Robert Arnold Vansittart — Recruiting Officer in charge of the Westminster Sub-Area, Ministry of National Service
Lieutenant William Vaughan 
William John Veale — Assistant, Parliamentary and General Department, Ministry of Munitions
James Richard Vellacott — Managing Partner, Messrs. J. R. Vellacott & Co.
Margaret Venables — Superintendent of Typists, War Office
Ella Margaret Venn — Superintendent of Garment Room, Central Red Cross Work Rooms, London
Captain Charles Vickers — Master, Mercantile Marine
Henry Frederic Vilmet Oldham-Vilmet — Assistant Secretary, Ministry of National Service, London Region
Lieutenant George Waddingham — Australian Divisional Artillery
Thomas Callander Wade — County Director for Stirlingshire, Scottish Branch, British Red Cross Society
Captain William John Wade — Assistant Director of Cold Storage, Ministry of Food
John Waghorne — Chairman, Cheltenham Local Tribunal
Ellen Charlotte Wagstaffe — Welfare  Supervisor at a National Shell Factory
Mabel Frances Hewitt Wainwright — Honorary Secretary, Rycroft Hall Auxiliary Hospital, Audenshaw, Manchester
James Waite — Senior Assistant Inspector of Munitions Areas; in charge of Steel Research Section, Ministry of Munitions
William Birkbeck Wakefield — Member of the War Emergency Committee, YMCA
Alfred John Waldegrave — Accountant-General's Department, General Post Office
Alice Waldegrave — Secretary, Sherborne Division, British Red Cross and Order of St. John of Jerusalem; Quarter Master, Castle Auxiliary Hospital, Sherbome
William Herbert Walden — Assistant Inspector of Medical Supplies, Army Medical Service
Lieutenant Keith Jerome Walker — For an act of gallantry not in the presence of the enemy
William Joseph Wall  —  Second Class Manager, Coventry Employment Exchange, Ministry of Labour
Lieutenant Martin Oliver Walsh — For an act of gallantry not in the presence of the enemy
Edna Walter — Honorary Secretary of National Economy Exhibition, Manchester
Ada Grace Ward — Commandant, Leckhampton Court Auxiliary Hospital, Cheltenham
Lieutenant-Colonel Edward Ward — Assistant Inspector, Sheljs (Technical), Ministry of Munitions
John Henry Ward — Acting First Assistant Electrical Engineer, Department of Director of Dockyards and Repairs, Admiralty
Lieutenant Tom Ward — For an act of gallantry not in the presence of the enemy
Lieutenant Arthur Kingsley Wardroper — For an act of gallantry not in the presence of the enemy
William Findlay Warnock — Chief Draughtsman in Shipyard of Messrs. John Brown & Co.
Marmont Warren — Central Marine Engineering Works, West Hartlepool
Donald Waters — Superintendent, Metropolitan Police
Dorothy Emily Watkins — Superintendent, Young Women's Christian Association. Munition Workers' Canteen
John Stewart Watkins — Steam Tug Owner
Captain Ernest Alfred William Watney — For services with the British Expeditionary Force in France
Albert Harold Joseph Watson —  Naval Store Department, Admiralty
James Watson  —  Foreman Turner, Messrs. David Rowan & Co., Glasgow
John Watson  Commander, Hull Special Constabulary
Marguerite Audrey Watson — Voluntary Aid Detachment, Cairo
Mildred Jane Musgrave Watson — Head of Women's Section, National War Savings Committee
Madge Robertson Watt — Chief Organiser of Women's Institutes, Food Production Department
Captain John William Watt — Master of a Transport
John Watters — Manager of Iron Department, Messrs. Workman, Clarke & Co., Belfast
Lieutenant Charles Henry Weaver — Stores Department, Red Cross Commission, Mesopotamia
Captain Alexander Webster — Master, Mercantile Marine
Lilian Emily Welch — Secretary,  Packing Department, Queen Mary's Needlework Guild
Lieutenant Robert Wellington  Head of Fruit Section, Horticultural Division, Food Production Department
Mildmay Francis Wells —  Late of Mineral Resources Department, Ministry of Munitions. 
Selkirk Wells —  Navy and Army Canteen Board
Charles West  Recruiting Duties
Gertrude Cleave Westbrook — Prisoners of War Information Bureau
John Richard Westcott — Secretary, Alexandria Conference, Ministry of Shipping
Captain Reginald Granville Westmacott — For services with the British Expeditionary Force in France
Henry Gould Weston — Supervisor Clerk, Registry — Directorate of Mobilization, War Office
Frederick Malcolm Wharton — Manager, The New Explosives Co., Ltd.
Ursula Mary Wheble — Honorary Superintendent, Reading War Hospital Supply Depot
Edward Thomas Wheeler — Chief Officer of the Fire Brigade at a National Filling Factory; for gallantry on the occasion of a serious fire and explosion
George Frederick Whiles — Deputy Superintendent of Paper, Stationery Office
Eileen Whitaker — Commandant, Babworth Hall Auxiliary Hospital, East Retford, Nottinghamshire
Charles Arthur White — Principal, Aston Technical School, Birmingham
Jessie McHardie White — Principal Matron, Australian Army Nursing Service
Percival White — Honorary Secretary, Plymouth War Savings Committee
Mary Catharine Whitehead — Lady Superintendent, YMCA, King's Cross Station
Roy Drummond Whitehorn — General Secretary for Army Work in India, YMCA
Captain Frederick Ernest Banister Whitfield  —  Royal Air Force (Wing Adjutant)
Gunner Ernest James Whiting 
Mary Fanny Whittaker — Adjutant, Salvation Army
Lieutenant Geoffrey Budibent Whitworth — Visiting Officer, Stores Department, Boulogne, British Red Cross Commission, France
Lieutenant Aubrey John Graham-Wigan — For an act of gallantry not in the presence of the enemy
Edith Marguerite Wignall — Officer-in-Charge, St. John Hospital, Tattenhall
Norman Ward Wild — In charge of Statistical Section of Inspection Department, Ministry of Munitions
Chief Boatswain Edward H. Wilder  Assistant to King's Harbour Master, Gibraltar
Margaret Mabel Wilkins — Member of the British War Mission to the United States of America
Martin Wilkinson — Engine Works Machine Shop Foreman, Messrs. Swan, Hunter and Wigham Richardson
Emma Christine Williams  Medical Officer at a Shell Filling Factory
Leonard Henry Williams —  Ministry of National Service
Lieutenant Percy Alec Williams — For an act of gallantry not in the presence of the enemy
Rhoda Mary Westropp Williamson — Lady Clerk, Finance Department, War Office
Charles Willis — Clerk, War Office
Maud Mary Willis — Joint Honorary Secretary, Rotherham Belgian Refugees Committee
The Rev. Michael Hamilton Gibson Willis — County Director, County Down, Irish Branch, British Red Cross Society
Marian Margaret Wills — Organising Secretary, American Women's War Relief Fund
Edith Annie Wilson — Superintendent at Munition Workers Canteen
George Alexander Wilson. Steel Works Manager, The Cargo Fleet Iron Co., Ltd.
James Wilson — Member of the Appeal Tribunal of the County of Lanark
Margaret Rowley Wilson — Commandant and Quarter Master, Ash Auxiliary Hospital, Sandwich, Kent
Robert James Wilson —  Treasury Solicitor's Department, Law Courts Branch, Admiralty Division
William Major Wilson — Staff Clerk, Local Government Board
Ada Mary Winder — County Secretary, County Cork, Irish Branch, British Red Cross Society
Captain John Travell Witts — For services with the British Expeditionary Force, Salonika
Evelyn Wolferstan — Joint Women's Voluntary Aid Detachment Department, Devonshire House
Gamble Ekin Vickers Wood — Sub-Section Director, Contracts Department, Ministry of Munitions
William Stanley Woodcock — Acting Deputy Commissioner, St. John Ambulance Brigade, West Lancashire
Walter Lee Woodhams — Organiser of Assistance to Belgian Refugees
Nor ah Blanche Woodman — Matron, Belgian Refugees Camp, Earl's Court
Constance Ada Woods — President of the Munitions Canteen Lady Workers at an important Munitions Centre
Charles William Woodward — Secretary, War Office Commodities Committee, War Trade Department
Annie Elizabeth Wordsworth — Head Mistress of the Girls' Department, Wrexham County School
Captain William Percy Worth —  Red Cross Transport Officer, Folkestone Headquarters Staff
Nora Mary Bayley Worthington — Voluntary Aid Detachment Commandant, British Red Cross Commission, France
Gwenyth Worthington — Commandant, Foxlowe Auxiliary Hospital, Leek, Staffordshire
Albert Charles Wren — Clerk, London Regional Headquarters, Ministry of National Service
Calvin Wright — Chief Special Constable, Great Grimsby Special Constabulary
Clare Elise Ellington Wright —  War Trade Intelligence Department
2nd Lieutenant Douglas William Wright — For an act of gallantry not in the presence of the enemy
Florence Helena Wright — Commandant, "Balmoral " Auxiliary Hospital, Llandudno
Mary Veronica Wright —  Department of HM Procurator General, Intelligence Branch
Major Stephen Wright —  Acting Inspector of Army Catering
Thomas Wright —  Outside Engine Works Manager, Messrs. Harland and Wolff, Belfast
Constance Wrigley —  Part Founder of Timberhurst Auxiliary Hospital, Bury, East Lancashire
Katharina Montagu Wyatt — Commandant, Lady Ridley's Hospital, Carlton House Terrace, London
Lily Doughtie-Wylie —  Limenaria Hospital and Sanatorium, Thasos
Ellen Yeld — Chief Dairy Instructress to the Hereford County Council
Clarence Ross Young — Clerk, Local Government Board
Annie Youngman — Higher Grade Woman Clerk, Ministry of Shipping
Lieutenant John Copeland Zigomala — For an act of gallantry not in the presence of the enemy

India
Ismay Gertrude Hardy
Mabel Alice Gracey
Tempe Kealy — Secretary (temporarily President) of the Ladies' Red Cross Committee, North-West Frontier Province
Dorothy Starr Jackson
Mary Louisa Browning — Local Secretary of the Madras War Fund Ladies' Depot, Trichur, Cochin State, Madras
Vera Fremantle. Jnanendra Nath Gupta, Indian Civil Service; Magistrate and Collector, Rangpur, Bengal
Antoinette Clarke
Hilda Mumford
Mrs. Stennet Hemingway
Mrs. Dutt
Mrs. Euphan Nevill
Florence Ida Peirse
Mrs. Caro Playfair
Charles Frederick Laslett — Chief Engineer, Royal Indian Marine, Bengal
Alice Stuart Milne
Robina Olive Sullivan — Secretary, Ganjam District Ladies' Red Cross Depot
Dorothy Broomfield — President, Women's Branch of the War Relief Fund, Ahmedabad
Visalakshi Narayana Ayyar
Commissary and Honorary Major James Arbery. India Miscellaneous List, Survey of India
Lieutenant-Commander John Chappell Ward — Royal Indian Marine; Assistant Port Officer and Deputy Shipping Master, Calcutta
Henry John Andrews  —  Indian Medical Service; Medical Officer in charge of the Thomas Emery Hospital at Moradabad, United Provinces
Prasanna Kumar Ray, Dora Stewert de Chazal. Nellore District representative of the Madras War Fund Ladies' Depot.
Herbert Hunley Shaw — Deputy Collector and District Assistant Recruiting Officer, Bulandshahr, United Provinces
Badu Budh -Sen — Deputy Collector. Muzaffarnagar, United Provinces
Pandit Manmohan Nath Gurtu — Deputy Collector, Etah, United Provinces
Babu Sardar Singh — Deputy Collector. Muttra, United Provinces
Pandit Ganga Dutt Joshi, Tahsildar, Kham Superintendent, Garhwal, United Provinces
Donald St. John Havock — Superintendent of Excise, 4th Grade, Burma
Richard Robertson — Indian Telegraph Department, Deputy Superintendent Engineering
Gwendoline Gittings
Captain Thomas George Green  Superintendent, Government Printing Press, and Acting Commandant, Volunteer Rifles, Nagpur, Central Provinces
Honorary Captain Nawab Ahmed Nawaz Khan, Saddozai, Nawab of Dera, Cantonment Magistrate, Dera Ismail Khan, North-West Frontier Province
Ernest Robert Powell — Senior Inspector of Factories, Nagpur; Central Provinces
Rao Bahadur Shrinivasulu Naidu —  Divisional Forest Officer, Nagpur, Central Provinces
M. Narsing Rao —  Divisional Forest Officer, Bhandara, Central Provinces
William Hayward —  Extra Assistant Resident, Bushire, Persian Gulf
Thomas Gregson —  Locomotive and Carriage Superintendent, Oudh and Rohilkhand Railway, Lucknow, United Provinces
Charles James Knowles, Personal Assistant to the Adjutant-General in India
Honorary Captain Devasahayam Sardar Bahadur  —   late Subedar-Major, 2nd Queen Victoria's Own Sappers and Miners; Honorary Aide-de-Camp to His Excellency the Commander-in-Chief in India
Honorary Captain Bishan Singh Kathait —  Sardar Bahadur, late Subedar-Major, 9th Gurkha Rifles
Babu Srimanta Kumar Das Gupta —  Sub-Divisional Officer of Kurigram, Rangpur, Bengal
Nirmal Sankar Sen — Sub-Divisional Officer, Nator, Rajshahi, Bengal
Percival James Anderson —  Extra Assistant Commissioner, Ghakwal, Jielum District, Punjab
Munshi Muhammad Zaman Khan — Extra Assistant Commissioner, Rawalpindi, Punjab
Sardar Bahadur Khan — Extra Assistant Commissioner, Attock, Punjab
Lala Amar Nath  Extra Assistant Commissioner, Gujranwala, Punjab
Abdul Majid Khan — Barrister-at-Law; Extra Assistant Commissioner, Attock, Punjab
Babu Shyam Naryan Singh — Personal Assistant to the Commissioner, Bihar and Orissa
Babu Arun Kumar Bose — Deputy Magistrate, Rauchi, Bihar and Orissa
Babu Lakshminarayan Patnaik —  Munsif, Palamau, Bihar and Orissa
Ramchandra Moreshwar Pardhi  —  Extra Assistant Commissioner, Akola, Berar, Central Provinces
Khan Sahib Ishtiak Ali — Extra Assistant Commissioner, Damoh, Central Provinces
Rai Bahadur Bhola Nath — Extra Assistant Commissioner, Baluchistan
U. Kmuin Manik. Siem of Mylliem, Assam
U. Harison. Siem of Rambray, Assam
Frances Carr Ross Alston. 
Narendra Nath Ghatak — Barrister-at-Law, High Court, Calcutta
Pandit Daulat Ram Kalia — Barrister-at-Law, Ferozepore, Punjab
Serene Cowasji
Rai Bahadur Gopal Das Bhandari — Pleader, Amritsar, Punjab
Rai Bahadur Pandit Davi Chand — Pleader, Jullundur, Punjab
Babu Pyari Lai Dass — Pleader; Chairman Dacca Municipality, Bengal
Babu Kamini Kumar Das. Vakil, Chittagong, Bengal
Ram Krishna Raoji Jaywant — Pleader, Amraoti, Berar, Central Provinces
Lillian May McCaully Hayes — Secretary, Trichinopoly Ladies' Red Cross Depot
Dr Vinayak Narayan Bhajekar, Bombay
Surat Kunwar Chaudhuri  (Lahore). Benares State Service, United Provinces
Edwin Andrew Cuthbert Hindmarsh  Officiating Civil Surgeon, Muzaffarpur, Bihar and Orissa
May Hall-Wright
Clement Hall Brierly — Superintendent, sub pro tem, Central Prison, Yeravda, Bombay
Subedar Wali Muhammad Khan — 25th Punjabis, Bengal Police, Inspector of Armed Police, Malda, Bengal
Helene Robson. Hon — Secretary, Ajmer-Merwara Branch of the British Red Cross Society and the Order of St. John of Jerusalem
Ethel Tydeman
Sidney Hugh Reaks — Senior Master Pilot, Officiating Assistant Port Officer and Deputy Shipping Master, Calcutta
Khan Bahadur Chaudhuri Karam Ilahi Chaththa — Honorary Magistrate of Ahmednagar, Gujranwala District, Punjab
Rai Sahib Lala Bam Gopal — Landowner and Honorary Magistrate and Vice-President, Municipal Committee, Sirsa, Hissar District, Punjab
Khan Sahib Chaudhri Fazal Ali — Honorary Magistrate and Sub-Eegistrar, Ajnala, Gujrat District, Punjab
Khan Bahadur Arbab Muhammad Azam Khan, of Kotla — Honorary Magistrate, 1st Class, North-West Frontier Province
Khan Bahadur Haji Karim Bakhsh, Sethi, of Peshawar — Honorary Magistrate, 2nd Class, North-West Frontier Province
Lekhraj Khiomal, of Hyderabad (Sind), Bombay
Pestan Shah Nussedwanji Vakil — Proprietor, Victoria Iron Works, Ahmedabad, Bombay
John Howitson Wiggett  —   of Messrs. T. E. Thomson & Co.; Master, Trades Association, Calcutta
Margaret Gillespie — Honorary Secretary, Bassein Branch of the British Red Cross Society and Order of St. John of Jerusalem
Raja Mahendra Ranjan Ray Chaudhuri  —   Zamindar of Kakina, Rangpur, Bengal
Babu Manindra Chandra Singh  —   Zamindar, Bengal
Chaudhri Farzand Ali Khan — Landowner; Zaildar of Sohna and Honorary Magistrate, Gurgaon District, Punjab
Norman Grant — Landowner, Sahibganj, Bihar and Orissa
Babu Shiba Prasad Singh  —   of Jharia. Landowner, Bihar and Orissa
Rai Sahib Chandra Narayan Gupta — Landowner, Bihar and Orissa
Maurice Roberts Wilson Hart, Indian Subordinate Medical Department; Assistant Surgeon, Madras
M. R. Ry. Tiruvadi Chidambara Ramaswami Sarma Avargal — Sub-Assistant Surgeon, Madras
Khan Sahib Sayad Nazir Hussain. Indian Subordinate Medical Department; Civil Surgeon, Mianwali, Punjab
Babu Upendra Nath Sen  —   Shipping Broker, Calcutta
Babu Atal Chandra Ghose  —   Shipping Broker, Calcutta
Jamsetji Dinshaw Antia  —   Audit-Department, Bombay, Baroda, and Central India Railway, Bombay
Georgina Jessie Chisholm Davis — In charge of the Bhopal Agency Centre of the Joint War Committee, Central India
Mary Denham Spence — In charge of the Bundelkhand Agency Centre of the Joint War Committee, Central India
M. R. Ry. Diwan Bahadur Mandayam Ananda Pillay Parthasarathi Ayyangar Avargal, B.L.   —   Retired Cashier, Bank of Madras
Gertrude Jessop  —   Formerly Matron, Hospital Ship, Madras
Margaret Carrick  —   Nurse, Madras
Margaret Deaken  —   Bombay
Adeline Elizabeth Whitcombe  —   Poona, Bombay
Lokendra Nath Palit
Annie Ewing — Superintendent, Bible Women's Institute, Entally, Calcutta
Khan Bahadur Mir Tawaqqul Husain   —  of Pirpur, Fyzabad, United Provinces
Nawab Ahmad Saiyed Khan   —  of Chitari, District Bulandshahr, United! Provinces
Chaudhri Data Ram  —   of Daurala, District Meerut, United Provinces
Rai Bahadur Dharma Nand Joshi — Honorary Magistrate, Almora, United Provinces
Pandit Maharaj Kishan  —   Tahsildar of Moga, Ferozepore District, Punjab
Subedar-Major Ashaq Ali   —   of Kalanaur, Rohtak District, Punjab
Mian Yar Muhammad Khan of Jahan Khelan in Hoshiarpur District, Punjab
Resaldar. Bahadur Sahaj Ram   —   of Mehm, District Rohtak, Punjab
Sardar Fateh Singh   —  of Sayanwala, Ferozepore District; Risaldar in the Supply and Transport Reserve, Punjab
Raja Fateh Singh   —  of Lahore, Punjab
Flora Wardle  —   Bihar and Orissa
Anna Katherine Ashe — Honorary Lady Superintendent, Soldiers Home, Rawalpindi
Babu Jagin Sangma  —   Laskar, Garo Hills, Assam
Khan Sahib Maulvi Mohammad Abdul Latif  —   Mauzadar, Garo Hills, Assam
Rai Sahib Lala Tirath Ram Shah
Khatri, of Nawashahr  —   Honorary Secretary, Notified Area, Nawashahr, North-West Frontier Province
Khan Bahadur Wadera Nur Muhammad   —  Bangalbai, Kalat State, Baluchistan
Henry Hart   —   Mysore Residency
Philippa Vores

Egypt and the Sudan
Percy Harry East — Director of Works in the Public Works Department
Charles Leavers Hall — Director of Works in the Public Works Department
Arthur Henry Johnstone, Business Manager, YMCA, Egyptian Expeditionary Force
Alexander Robertson Craig — Chief Archivist, Residency, Cairo
Arthur Owen Williams Postmaster, Cairo
Lieutenant George Wyman Bury 
The Rev. Samuel Hanna Kennedy  YMCA, Alexandria
Arthur Sidney Merton — Director of Commercial Section in Ministry of Agriculture
George Ronald Storrar — Divisional Engineer, Sudan Government Railways
Charles Craven Howell Walker — Commercial Agent, Sudan Government; His Britannic Majesty's Consul for Western Abyssinia
John Edgar Williams — Chief Electrical Engineer, Public Works Department, Sudan Government
Arthur Philip Bolland — Secretary, Sudan Agency

Honorary Members
Ali Ibrahim Bey — Senior Assistant Surgeon at Kasr-el-Ainy Hospital, Cairo
Wadih Bey Birbari — Principal Medical Officer, Nagazig Hospital
George Bey Mishalany — Superintendent of Workshops, Department of Stores

See also
1918 Birthday Honours - Full list of awards.

References

Birthday Honours
1918 awards
1918 in Australia
1918 in Canada
1918 in India
1918 in New Zealand
1918 in the United Kingdom